This list of Jewish athletes in sports contains athletes who are Jewish and have attained outstanding achievements in sports. The topic of Jewish participation in sports is discussed extensively in academic and popular literature (See also: List of Jews in sports (non-players)). Scholars believe that sports have been a historical avenue for Jewish people to overcome obstacles toward their participation in secular society, especially before the mid-20th century in Europe and the United States.

The criteria for inclusion in this list are:
 1–3 places winners at major international tournaments;
 for team sports, winning in preliminary competitions of finals at major international tournaments, or playing for several seasons for clubs of major national leagues; or
 holders of past and current world records.

Boldface denotes a current competitor.

To be included in the list, one does not necessarily have to practice Judaism, or to hail from Israel. Some members of the list may practice other religions or no religion at all, but are of Jewish descent.

Athletes

American football 

 Doc Alexander, US, G, 2× All-Pro
 Lyle Alzado, US, DE, 2× All-Pro
 Harris Barton, US, OT, 2× All-Pro
 David Binn, US, LS, All-Pro
 Adam Bisnowaty, US, T (free agent)
 Arthur Bluethenthal, US, C
 Justin Boren, US, OG
 Zach Boren, US, FB (free agent)
 Daniel Braverman US, WR (free agent)
 Greg Camarillo, US, WR
 Noah Cantor, Canada, DT, Canadian Football League
Gabe Carimi, US, OT, All-American and Outland Trophy
Jake Curhan, US, OT (Seattle Seahawks)
Jordan Dangerfield, US, SS (free agent)
JT Daniels, US, QB, Gatorade Player of the Year
Brian de la Puente, US, C (free agent)
A. J. Dillon, US, RB (Green Bay Packers)
Michael Dunn, US, G (Cleveland Browns)
Nate Ebner, US, DB (free agent)
 Brad Edelman, US, OG, 1× Pro Bowl
Julian Edelman, US, WR, MVP in Super Bowl LIII
 Hayden Epstein, US, K
 Carl Etelman, US, B
 Drew Ferris, US, LS (free agent) 
 Jay Fiedler, US, QB
 Anthony Firkser, US, TE (Atlanta Falcons)
 John Frank, US, TE
 Benny Friedman, US, QB, 4× All-Pro, Hall of Fame
 Lennie Friedman, US, G
 Antonio Garay, US, DT
 Sid Gillman, US, End, former player and coach
 Adam Goldberg, US, OL
 Bill Goldberg, US, DT; professional wrestler (4× world champion)
 Marshall Goldberg, US, RB, All-Pro
 Charles "Buckets" Goldenberg, US, G & RB, All-Pro
 Lou Gordon, US, OL
 Ben Gottschalk, US, C (free agent)
 Randy Grossman, US, TE
 Arnold Horween, US, halfback, fullback, center, and blocking back (quarterback), Harvard All-American, and NFL player
 Ralph Horween, US, fullback, halfback, punter, and drop-kicker, Harvard All-American and NFL player
 Greg Joseph, South African, kicker (Minnesota Vikings)
 Andrew Kline, US, G
 Kyle Kosier, US, OL
 Len Levy, US, G
 Erik Lorig, US, FB
 Sid Luckman, US, QB, 8× All-Pro, MVP, Hall of Fame
 Joe Magidsohn, Russia, Halfback
 Ali Marpet, US, G
Taylor Mays, US, S
 Sam McCullum, US, WR
 Josh Miller, US, P
 Wayne Millner, US, E, DE, Hall of Fame
 Ron Mix, US, OT, 9× All-Pro, Hall of Fame
 Aaron Murray, US, QB
 Ed Newman, US, G, All-Pro
 Harry Newman, US, QB, All-Pro
 Brent Novoselsky, US, TE
 Igor Olshansky, Ukraine, DE
 Adam Podlesh, US, P
 Merv Pregulman, US, T & C, College Football Hall of Fame
 Josh Rosen, US, QB (free agent)
 Sage Rosenfels, US, QB
 Mike Rosenthal, US, T
 Adam Schreiber, US, C/LS
 Geoff Schwartz, US, OT
 Mitchell Schwartz, US, OT, All-Pro
Mike Seidman, US, TE
 Allie Sherman, US, running back & coach
 Sam Sloman, US, K (free agent)
 Scott Slutzker, US, TE
 Paul Steinberg, US, FB/HB
 Terrell Suggs, US, DE, All-Pro
 Joseph Taussig, Germany-born US, QB
 Josh Taves, US, DE
 Andre Tippett, US, LB, 2× All-Pro, Hall of Fame
 Alan Veingrad, US, OL
 Gary Wood, US, QB
 Sid Youngelman, US, OT

Association football (soccer)

 

Liel Abada, Israel, forward (Celtic F.C. & national team)
Ryan Adeleye, US/Israel, defender (Atlantic City FC)
 Jeff Agoos, US, defender (national team)
 Yari Allnut, US, midfielder (national team)
 Hennadiy Altman, Ukraine, goalkeeper
 Kyle Altman, US, defender
 Dudu Aouate, Israel, goalkeeper (RCD Mallorca & national team)
Gary Assous. France/Israel, midfielder (Hapoel Katamon Jerusalem F.C.)
Jonathan Assous, France/Israel, defensive midfielder (Beitar Ramat Gan)
Gai Assulin, Israel, winger/attacking midfielder (Politehnica Iași & national team)
Yael Averbuch, US, midfielder
Pini Balili, Israel, striker (Maccabi Ironi Bat Yam & national team)
Tal Banin, Israel, midfielder, national team, manager
Orr Barouch, Israel, striker (Cal FC & national team)
David Beckham, UK, midfielder, England national team
Kyle Beckerman, US, midfielder (Real Salt Lake & national team)
David "Dedi" Ben Dayan, Israel, left defender (Maccabi Petah Tikva & national team)
 Tal Ben Haim, Israel, center back/right back (Beitar Jerusalem & national team)
 Arik Benado, Israel, defender (national team)
Yossi Benayoun, Israel, attacking midfielder
 Eyal Berkovic, Israel, midfielder (national team)
 Rhett Bernstein, US, defender (Miami FC)
 Steve Birnbaum, US, defender (D.C. United & national team)
 Gyula Bíró, Hungary, midfielder/forward (national team)
Nir Bitton, Israel, defender/midfielder (Maccabi Tel Aviv & national team)
Nick Blackman, England/Barbados/Israel, striker (Maccabi Tel Aviv & Barbados national team)
 Jean Bloch, France, Olympic silver
 Harald Bohr, Denmark, Olympic silver
 Louis Bookman, Lithuanian-born Ireland, forward
 Jonathan Bornstein, US/Israel, left back/midfielder (Chicago Fire &  national team)
 David Boysen, Denmark, left winger (Fremad Amager)
 Daniel Brailovski, Argentina/Uruguay, midfielder (Argentina, Mexico, Uruguay, & Israel national teams)
 Adam Braz, Canada, defender
Ashley Brown, Australia, football (soccer) player Melbourne Victory
Jordan Brown, Australia, midfielder (Melbourne Victory)
Tomer Chencinski, Israel/Canada, goalkeeper (Shamrock Rovers & national team)
 Jordan Cila, US, forward (Under-17 World Cup)
 Avi Cohen, Israel, defender (Liverpool, Rangers, Maccabi Tel Aviv & national team)
 Yonatan Cohen, Israel, attacking midfielder/forward (Pisa S.C. & Maccabi Tel Aviv &  national team)
 Martin Cohen, South Africa, midfielder (Highlands Park, LA Aztecs, California Surf, Wits University & national team)
 Steven Cohen, France-Israel, midfielder (free agent)
 Tamir Cohen, Israel, midfielder (national team)
 Edgar Davids, Netherlands, midfielder (Ajax Amsterdam, Juventus, and national team)
 Rolf Decker, Germany-born US, midfielder (US national team)
 Micky Dulin, England (Tottenham)
 Ernő Egri Erbstein, Hungary, midfielder
 Yakov Ehrlich, Russia, striker (FC Ocean Kerch)
Sol Eisner, US, forward (New York Americans and USMNT)
Ilay Elmkies, Israel, midfielder (Hoffenheim / Hoffenheim II & national team)
Benny Feilhaber, Brazil/US, center/attacking midfielder (Sporting Kansas City & US national team)
 Lajos Fischer, Hungary, goalkeeper, national team player
 Otto Fischer, Austria, national team player and coach 
 Gottfried Fuchs, Germany/Canada (Germany national team)
Dean Furman, South Africa, midfielder (Warrington Rylands 1906 & national team)
 Peter Fuzes, Australia, goalkeeper
 Sándor Geller, Hungary, goalkeeper, Olympic champion
 Mikhail Gershkovich, USSR, forward, Europe U-19 Champion (national team)
 Ludwik Gintel, Poland, defender and forward (national team)
 Andy Gruenebaum, US, goalkeeper
 Jake Girdwood-Reich, Australia, midfielder, Sydney FC and Australia U20s
 Béla Guttmann, Hungary, midfielder, national team player & international coach
 Rudy Haddad, France/Israel, midfielder
 Eddy Hamel, US, right winger (AFC Ajax; killed by the Nazis in Auschwitz)
 Julius Hirsch, Germany, winger, (Karlsruher FV; killed by the Nazis)
 Ya'akov Hodorov, Israel, goalkeeper (national team)
 Rinus Israel, Netherlands, defender (Feyenoord and national team)
Joe Jacobson, Wales, left back (Wycombe Wanderers & U21 national team)
Tvrtko Kale, Croatia/Israel, goalkeeper
 Viktor Kanevskyi, USSR, striker & manager
Tal Karp, Australia, midfielder (Melbourne Victory)
Scott Kashket, England, striker (Gillingham)
Yaniv Katan, Israel, forward/winger (Maccabi Haifa & national team)
Josh Kennet, England/Israel, midfielder/right back (London Lions)
 Gyula Kertész, Hungary, winger, player & manager
 Vilmos Kertész, Hungary, winger, 47 national team caps
 Józef Klotz, Poland, national team; killed by the Nazis
 Konstantin Krizhevsky, USSR/Russia, defender (national team)
 Mark Lazarus, England, right winger
 Jonathan Levin, Mexico, midfielder (Phoenix Rising)
Lucas Matías Licht, Argentina, left defender/left winger (Villa San Carlos)
Marcelo Lipatin, Uruguay, forward (C.D. Trofense)
 Józef Lustgarten, Poland (17 years in the Gulag)
Zac MacMath, US, goalkeeper (Real Salt Lake)
 Mickaël Madar, France, striker
 Melissa Maizels, Australia, goalkeeper (Melbourne Victory FC (W-League))
 Gyula Mándi, Hungary, half back (player & coach of Hungarian and Israeli national teams)
Ofir Marciano, Israel, goalkeeper (Feyenoord & national team)
 Shep Messing, US, goalkeeper (national team), manager, and sportscaster
 Federico Mociulsky, Argentina, midfielder (Deportivo Roca)
 Bennie Muller, Netherlands, midfielder (Ajax Amsterdam and national team)
Andriy Oberemko, Ukraine, midfielder (Mariupol & U21 national team)
 Eli Ohana, Israel, won UEFA Cup Winners' Cup and Bravo Award (most outstanding young player in Europe); national team; manager
 Árpád Orbán, Hungary, Olympic champion
 Sid O'Linn, South Africa and Charlton Athletic
 José Pékerman, Argentina, midfielder, former player, current coach and manager
Dor Peretz, Israel, defensive midfielder (Maccabi Tel Aviv & national team)
Zach Pfeffer, US, midfielder (Philadelphia Union)
Suf Podgoreanu, Israel,  forward  (Spezia Calcio & Maccabi Haifa & national team)
 Roni Porokara, Finland, winger (national team)
 Boris Razinsky, USSR/Russia, goalkeeper/striker, Olympic champion, manager
Charlie Reiter, US, forward (Pali Blues)
 Haim Revivo, Israel, attacking/side midfielder (national team)
Daniël de Ridder, Netherlands, forward winger/attacking midfielder (SC Cambuur & U21 national team)
 Ronnie Rosenthal, Israel, left winger/striker (national team)
 Moshe Romano, Israel, striker (national team)
 Sebastian Rozental, Chile, forward (national team)
 Patricio Sayegh, Argentina, striker
David Schipper, US, midfielder/fullback (Southern United)
 Aaron Schoenfeld, US/Israel, forward (Austin & Israel national team)
 Ronnie Schwartz, Denmark, striker (Vendsyssel FF) 
 Béla Sebestyén, Hungary, winger (national team)
 Gyorgy Silberstein / Szeder. Hungary, killed by the Nazis in Birnbaum  
 Barry Silkman, England (QPR/Man City) 
Manor Solomon, Israel, winger/attacking midfielder (Fulham F.C. & national team)
 Juan Pablo Sorín, Argentina, defender (national team)
Jonathan Spector, US, defender (Orlando City SC & national team)
 Leon Sperling, Poland, left wing (national team; killed by the Nazis in the Lemberg Ghetto)
 Giora Spiegel, Israel, midfielder (national team)
 Mordechai Spiegler, Soviet Union/Israel, striker (Israel national team), manager
Daniel Steres, US, defender (Houston Dynamo)
Sjaak Swart, Netherlands, winger (Ajax)
Jordan Swibel, Australia, forward
 Idan Tal, Israel, midfielder (Beitar Jerusalem & national team)
Nicolás Tauber, Argentina/Israel, goalkeeper (Villa San Carlos)
Matt Turner, US, goalkeeper (Arsenal F.C. & national team)
Joris van Overeem, Netherlands/Israel, midfielder (Maccabi Tel Aviv )
 Yochanan Vollach, Israel, defender (national team)
Shon Weissman, Israel, forward (Real Valladolid & national team) 
 Sara Whalen, US, defender/forward, Olympic silver
DeAndre Yedlin, US, defender/midfielder (Inter Miami CF & national team)
Eran Zahavi, Israel, forward (Maccabi Tel Aviv  & national team)
Tomer Hemed, Israel, forward (Hapoel Be'er Sheva  & national team)

Australian rules football

 Keith Baskin, AFL footballer
 Mordy Bromberg, Australia, AFL footballer
Todd Goldstein, AFL footballer (North Melbourne Football Club)
 Julian Kirzner, AFL footballer
 Trevor Korn, VFL footballer
 Ezra Poyas, AFL and VFL footballer 
 Harry Sheezel, AFL footballer
 Ian Synman, AFL footballer, only Jew to play in a Premiership
 Michael Zemski, Australia, AFL footballer

Baseball

 

 
 

 Cal Abrams, US, outfielder
Rubén Amaro, Jr., US, outfielder, general manager, first base coach
 Morrie "Snooker" Arnovich, US, outfielder, All-Star
 Brad Ausmus, US, catcher, All-Star, 3× Gold Glove, manager
 José Bautista, Dominican-born, pitcher
 Robert "Bo" Belinsky, US, pitcher, no-hit game
 Moe Berg, US, catcher, and spy for US in World War II
 Jeremy Bleich, US-Israeli, pitcher (Team Israel)
Richard Bleier, US, pitcher (Boston Red Sox, Team Israel)
 Ron "Boomer" Blomberg, US, DH/first baseman/outfielder, Major League Baseball's first designated hitter, Israel Baseball League manager
 Zach Borenstein, US, outfielder (free agent)
 Lou Boudreau, US, shortstop, 8× All-Star, batting title, MVP, Baseball Hall of Fame, manager
 Ralph "Hawk" Branca, US, pitcher, 3× All Star
Ryan Braun, US, outfielder, 6× All-Star, home run champion, Rookie of the Year, 5× Silver Slugger, MVP (Milwaukee Brewers)
Alex Bregman, US, infielder, 2× All Star, Silver Slugger (Houston Astros)
Craig Breslow, US, relief pitcher
 Mark Clear, US, relief pitcher, 2× All-Star
 Andy Cohen, US, second baseman, coach
 Harry “the Horse” Danning, US, catcher, 4× All-Star
Ike Davis, US, first baseman
 Cody Decker, US, first baseman
 Jonathan de Marte, US-Israel, pitcher (Team Israel)
 Moe Drabowsky, US, pitcher
 Scott Effross, US, pitcher (New York Yankees)
 Harry Eisenstat, US, pitcher
 Mike "Superjew" Epstein, US, first baseman
 Al Federoff, US, second baseman & manager
 Harry Feldman, US, pitcher
 Scott Feldman, US, pitcher
 Gavin Fingleson, South African-born Australian, Olympic silver medalist
Jake Fishman, US-Israeli, pitcher (Oakland Athletics, Team Israel). 
 Micah Franklin, US, outfielder
Nate Freiman, US, first baseman
Max Fried, US, pitcher, All Star, 3× Gold Glove, 2× Fielding Bible Award, Silver Slugger (Atlanta Braves)
Sam Fuld, US, outfielder and general manager
Brad Goldberg, US, pitcher
 Jake Goodman, US, first baseman
 Sid Gordon, US, outfielder & third baseman, 2× All-Star
 John Grabow, US, relief pitcher
 Shawn Green, US, right fielder, 2× All-Star, Gold Glove, Silver Slugger
 Adam Greenberg, US, outfielder 
 Hank "The Hebrew Hammer" Greenberg, US, first baseman & outfielder, 5× All-Star, 4× home run champion, 4× RBI leader, 2× MVP, Baseball Hall of Fame
 Dalton Guthrie, US, infielder and outfielder (Philadelphia Phillies)
 Jason Hirsh, US, pitcher
 Ken Holtzman, US, starting pitcher, 2× All-Star, 2 no-hitters, Israel Baseball League manager
 Joe Horlen, US, pitcher, All-Star, ERA leader, no-hitter
 Jake Kalish, US, pitcher (Los Angeles Angels)
Rob Kaminsky, US, pitcher (Seattle Mariners)
 Gabe Kapler, US, outfielder, manager (San Francisco Giants), 2021 NL Manager of the Year
 Ty Kelly, US-Israeli, utility player (Los Angeles Dodgers; Team Israel)
 Ian Kinsler, US-Israeli, second baseman, 4× All-Star, hit for the cycle, 2× 30–30 club, 2× Gold Glove, Fielding Bible Award
 Jason Kipnis, US, second baseman, 2x All-Star, Jewish ancestry, practicing Roman Catholic (free agent)
 Sandy Koufax, US, starting pitcher, 7× All-Star, 1 perfect game, 4 no-hitters, 3× Triple Crown, 5× ERA leader, 4× strikeouts leader, 3× Wins leader, 2× W-L% leader, 2× World Series MVP, 3× Cy Young Award, MVP, Baseball Hall of Fame
 Dean Kremer, US-Israeli, pitcher (Baltimore Orioles; Team Israel)
 Barry Latman, US, pitcher, All-Star
Ryan Lavarnway, US-Israeli, catcher (Miami Marlins; Team Israel)
 Alon Leichman, Israel, pitcher, former player, now Cincinnati Reds assistant pitching coach
 Al Levine, US, relief pitcher
 Mike Lieberthal, US, catcher, 2× All-Star, Gold Glove
 Shlomo Lipetz, Israel, pitcher (Team Israel)
 Assaf Lowengart, Israel, infielder (Mansfield Mountaineers)
 Elliott Maddox, US, outfielder & third baseman
 Jason Marquis, US, starting pitcher, All-Star, Silver Slugger
 Erskine Mayer, US, pitcher
 Bob Melvin, US, catcher, manager (Oakland Athletics)
 Eli Morgan, US, pitcher (Cleveland Guardians; Team Israel)
Jon Moscot, US-Israeli, pitcher
 Sam Nahem, US, pitcher
 Jeff Newman, US, catcher & first baseman, All-Star, manager
Joc Pederson, US, outfielder, 2x All Star (San Francisco Giants, Team Israel)
 Barney "the Yiddish Curver" Pelty, US, pitcher
 Lip "the Iron Batter" Pike, US, outfielder, second baseman, manager, 4× home run champion, RBI leader
 Kevin Pillar, US, outfielder (Atlanta Braves, Team Israel)
 Jake Pitler, US, second baseman and coach
 Scott Radinsky, US, relief pitcher and coach
 Jimmie Reese, US, second baseman & third baseman
 Dave Roberts, US, pitcher
 Saul Rogovin, US, pitcher, ERA leader
 Al "Flip" Rosen, US, third baseman & first baseman, 4× All Star, 2× home run champion, 2× RBI leader, MVP
 Goody Rosen, Canada, outfielder, All-Star
 Kenny Rosenberg, US, pitcher (Los Angeles Angels)
 Bubby Rossman, US-Israeli, pitcher (Philadelphia Phillies; Team Israel)
 Josh Satin, US, second baseman
 Richie Scheinblum, US, outfielder, All-Star
 Mike "Lefty" Schemer, US, first baseman
 Scott Schoeneweis, US, pitcher
 Art Shamsky, US, outfielder & first baseman, Israel Baseball League manager
 Ryan Sherriff, US, pitcher (Boston Red Sox)
Larry Sherry, US, relief pitcher, World Series MVP
Norm Sherry, US, catcher, manager
 Mose "the Rabbi of Swat" Solomon, US, outfielder, set minor league home run record
 Robert Stock, US, pitcher (Doosan Bears; Team Israel)
 George Stone, US, outfielder, batting title
 Steve Stone, US, starting pitcher, All-Star, Wins leader, Cy Young Award
 Garrett Stubbs, US, catcher (Philadelphia Phillies; Team Israel)
 Rowdy Tellez, US, first baseman (Milwaukee Brewers)
 Danny Valencia, US-Israeli, third baseman (Team Israel)
 Phil "Mickey" Weintraub, US, first baseman & outfielder
 Zack Weiss, US-Israeli, pitcher (Los Angeles Angels; Team Israel)
 Steve Yeager, US, catcher, World Series MVP
 Andy Yerzy, Canada, catcher/first baseman (Arizona Diamondbacks)
 Kevin Youkilis, US, first baseman, third baseman, & left fielder, 3× All-Star, Gold Glove, Hank Aaron Award 
 Josh Zeid, US-Israeli, pitcher (Team Israel)

Basketball

 Eli Abaev , US & Israel, 6' 8" forward/center (Hapoel Be'er Sheva B.C.)
 Joe Alexander, US & Israel, 6' 8" forward (Maccabi Rishon LeZion)
 Ben Auerbach, US, 6' 1" guard
 Red Auerbach, US, player for George Washington University; U.S., Hall of Fame-inducted coach of the Boston Celtics
 Sam Balter, US, 5' 10" guard, Olympic champion
Miki Berkovich, Israel,  6'4" shooting guard
Sue Bird, US & Israel, WNBA 5' 9" point guard, 2× Olympic champion, 12× All-Star (Seattle Storm)
David Blatt, US & Israel, Israeli Premier Basketball League 6' 3.5" point guard, coached Russia National Basketball Team, Israel's Maccabi Tel Aviv to EuroLeague Championship, EuroLeague Coach of the Year, 4× Israeli League Coach of the Year, former Head Coach of the Cleveland Cavaliers, head coach of Turkish club Darussafaka 
Mike Bloom, US, NBA 6' 6" forward/center, ABA All-American
David Blu (formerly "Bluthenthal"), US & Israel, EuroLeague 6' 7" power forward (Maccabi Tel Aviv)
 Moysés Blás, Brazil, Olympics 5' 11" guard
 Harry Boykoff, US, NBA 6' 10" center
 Tal Brody, US & Israel, EuroLeague 6' 2" shooting guard
 Larry Brown, US, ABA 5' 9" point guard, 3× ABA All-Star, 3× assists leader, NCAA National Championship coach (1988), NBA coach, Olympic champion, Basketball Hall of Fame
Omri Casspi, Israel, NBA 6' 9" small forward, drafted in 1st round of 2009 NBA draft, for Memphis Grizzlies (Maccabi Tel Aviv)
 Steve Chubin, US, ABA 6' 3" guard
 Alex Chubrevich, Israel & Russia, Premier League 7' 0" center (Maccabi Haifa)
Alysha Clark, US-Israel, WNBA 5' 11" small forward (Washington Mystics)
Jeff Cohen, US, ABL 6' 7" power forward
Shawn Dawson, Israel, 6' 6" small forward/shooting guard (Bnei Herzliya)
Shay Doron, Israel & US, WNBA 5' 9" guard (Maccabi Ashdod)
 Stu Douglass, US & Israel, 6' 3" shooting guard (Maccabi Ashdod B.C.)
Lior Eliyahu, Israel, EuroLeague 6' 9" power forward, 2006 NBA draft (Orlando Magic; traded to Houston Rockets), playing in the EuroCup (European top tier) (Maccabi Ashdod)
Jordan Farmar, US, NBA 6' 2" point guard
 Marty Friedman, US, 5' 7" guard & coach, Hall of Fame
 Jack Garfinkel, US, NBA 6' 0" guard
 Julius Goldman, US/Canada, Player/Coach.  Implemented jump ball elimination rule change after every basket.
 Tamir Goodman, US-Israel, 6' 3"
 Ernie Grunfeld, Romania-born US, NBA 6' 6" guard/forward & GM, Olympic champion
 Yotam Halperin, Israel, EuroLeague 6' 5" guard, drafted in 2006 NBA draft by Seattle SuperSonics
 Sonny Hertzberg, US, NBA 5' 9" point guard, original NY Knickerbocker
 Art Heyman, US, NBA 6' 5" forward/guard
 Nat Holman, US, ABL 5' 11" guard & coach, Hall of Fame
 Red Holzman, US, BAA & NBA 5' 10" guard, 2× All-Star, & NBA coach, NBA Coach of the Year, Hall of Fame
Eban Hyams, India-Israel-Australia, Australian National Basketball League & Israeli Super League 6' 5" guard (Haryana Gold), first-ever Indian national to play in ULEB competitions
 Doron Jamchi, Israel, Israeli Basketball Premier League 6' 6" shooting guard/small forward
 Jacqui Kalin, US/Israel, Israel League 5' 8" point guard
 Oded Kattash, Israel, Premier League 6' 4" point guard & coach
 Joel Kramer, US, NBA 6' 7" forward
 Dave Kufeld, US, 6'8", first Orthodox Jew selected in the NBA draft
Sylven Landesberg, US-Israel-Austria, EuroLeague 6' 6" former UVA shooting guard/small forward (Beijing Royal Fighters)
 Rudy LaRusso, US, NBA 6' 7" forward/center, 5× All-Star
 Howard Lassoff, US/Israel, 6' 10" center, six-time Israeli Basketball League Champion with Maccabi Tel Aviv.
 T. J. Leaf, US/Israel, China 6' 10" power forward (Beijing Ducks)
 Nancy Lieberman, US, WNBA 5' 10" point guard, general manager, & coach, Olympic silver, Hall of Fame
 Yam Madar, Israel, 6' 3" guard (Partizan NIS) drafted by the NBA's Boston Celtics in 2020
Gal Mekel, Israel, 6' 3" point guard
 Yogev Ohayon, Israel, Super League 6' 2" point guard (Hapoel Holon)
 Bernard Opper, US, NBL & ABL 5' 10" guard, All-American at University of Kentucky
 Donna Orender (née Chait), US, Women's Pro Basketball League 5' 7" point guard, All-Star, former WNBA president
 Josh Pastner, US, NCAA 6' 0" guard & coach
 Zack Rosen, US, Super League 6' 1" point guard
 Lennie Rosenbluth, US, NBA 6' 4" forward
 Avi Schafer, Japan, B.League, 6' 10" center (SeaHorses Mikawa) 
 Danny Schayes, US, NBA 6' 11" center/forward (son of Dolph Schayes)
 Dolph Schayes, US, NBA 6' 7" forward/center, 3× FT% leader, 1× rebound leader, 12× All-Star, Hall of Fame, & coach (father of Danny Schayes)
 Ossie Schectman, US, NBA 6' 0" guard, scorer of first NBA basket
 Jon Scheyer, US, All-American, Head Coach Duke University 6' 5" shooting guard & point guard (Maccabi Tel Aviv)
 Barney Sedran, US, Hudson River League & New York State League 5' 4" guard, Hall of Fame
 Ezequiel Skverer, Argentina & Israel, 5' 11" point guard
 Tiago Splitter, Brazil, NBA 6' 11" power forward/center
 Amar'e Stoudemire, US & Israel, NBA 6' 10" power forward/center, 6× NBA All-Star, NBA Rookie of the Year (2003), 5× All-NBA Team
 Amit Tamir, Israel, Israel League 6' 10" power forward/center
 Sidney Tannenbaum, US, BAA 6' 0" guard, 2× All-American, left as NYU all-time scorer
Alex Tyus, US & Israel, 6' 8" power forward/center (ASVEL Basket)
 Neal Walk, US, NBA 6' 10" center
 Spencer Weisz, US & Israel, Premier League 6' 4" shooting guard/small forward (Hapoel Haifa)
 Jamila Wideman, US, WNBA 5' 6" guard
 Max Zaslofsky, US, NBA 6' 2" guard/forward, 1× FT% leader, 1× points leader, All-Star, ABA coach

Bowling

 Barry Asher, US, 10 PBA titles, PBA Hall of Fame
 Marshall Holman, US, 22 PBA titles (11th all-time);  PBA Hall of Fame
 Mark Roth, US, 34 PBA titles (5th all-time); PBA Hall of Fame

Boxing

 Barney Aaron (Young), English-born US lightweight, Hall of Fame
Salamo Arouch (The Ballet Dancer), Greece & Israel, the Middleweight Champion of Greece 1938, and the All-Balkans Middleweight Champion 1939
 Abe Attell ("The Little Hebrew"), US, world champion featherweight, 1906–12, Hall of Fame
 Monte Attell ("The Knob Hill Terror"), US, bantamweight
 Max Baer, US, world heavyweight champion 1934–35, wore a Star of David on his trunks
 Benny Bass ("Little Fish"), US, world champion featherweight & world champion junior lightweight, 1927–29, Hall of Fame
 Fabrice Benichou, France, world champion super bantamweight 1989
 Jack Kid Berg (Judah Bergman), England, world champion lightweight 1930, wore a Star of David on his trunks, Hall of Fame
 Maxie Berger, Canada, flyweight, junior welterweight, and welterweight, wore a Star of David on his trunks
 Samuel Berger, US, Olympic champion heavyweight 1904
 Jack Bernstein (also "John Dodick", "Kid Murphy", and "Young Murphy"), US, world champion junior lightweight 1923
 Nathan "Nat" Bor, US, Olympic bronze lightweight 1932
 Mushy Callahan (Vincente Sheer), US, world champion light welterweight 1926-30
 Joe Choynski ("Chrysanthemum Joe"), US, heavyweight, Hall of Fame
 Robert Cohen, French & Algerian, world champion bantamweight 1954-56
 Al "Bummy" Davis (Abraham Davidoff), US, welterweight & lightweight, wore a Star of David on his trunks
 Louis "Red" Deutsch, US, heavyweight, later famous as the proprietor of the Tube Bar in Jersey City, New Jersey and inspiration for Moe Szyslak on The Simpsons
Carolina Duer ("The Turk"), Argentine, WBO world champion super flyweight 2010, and bantamweight 2013
 John "Jackie" Fields (Jacob Finkelstein), US, world champion welterweight 1929 & Olympic champion featherweight 1924, Hall of Fame
Hagar Finer, Israel, WIBF champion bantamweight 2009
Yuri Foreman, Belarusian-born Israeli US middleweight and World Boxing Association champion super welterweight 2009
 Alexander Frenkel, undefeated cruiserweight who retired early.
 György Gedó, Hungary, Olympic champion light flyweight 1972
 Abe Goldstein, US, world champion bantamweight 1924
 Ruby Goldstein ("Ruby the Jewel of the Ghetto"), US, welterweight, wore a Star of David on his trunks
Roman Greenberg ("The Lion from Zion"), Israel, International Boxing Organization's Intercontinental champion heavyweight
 Stéphane Haccoun, France, featherweight, super featherweight, and junior lightweight
 Alphonse Halimi ("La Petite Terreur"), France, world champion bantamweight 1957
 Harry Harris ("The Human Hairpin"), US, world champion bantamweight 1901-02
 Abe "The Newsboy" Hollandersky, US, Panamanian heavyweight champion, American welterweight reputed to have fought 1,000 fights
 Gary Jacobs, Scottish, British, Commonwealth, and European (EBU) champion welterweight
 Harry Isaacs, South Africa, Olympic bronze medalist 1928
 Pavlo Ishchenko ("Wild Man"), Ukraine/Israel, bantamweight & lightweight, 2× European Amateur Boxing Championships medalist, and European Games medalist
 Ben Jeby (Morris Jebaltowsky), US, world champion middleweight 1933
 David "Star David" Kaminsky, Israel, junior lightweight
 Julie Kogon, US, 1947 New England Lightweight Champion; Connecticut Boxing Hall of Fame
 Solly Krieger ("Danny Auerbach"), US, world champion middleweight 1938-39
 Benny Leonard (Benjamin Leiner; "The Ghetto Wizard"), US, world champion lightweight 1917–1925, Hall of Fame
 Battling Levinsky (Barney Lebrowitz), US, world champion light heavyweight 1916–1920, Hall of Fame
 King Levinsky (Harry Kraków), US, heavyweight, also known as Kingfish Levinsky
 Harry Lewis (Harry Besterman), US, world champion welterweight 1908-11
 Ted "Kid" Lewis (Gershon Mendeloff), England, world champion welterweight (1915–1916, 1917–1919), Hall of Fame
 Sammy Luftspring, Canada, Canadian champion welterweight, Canada's Sports Hall of Fame
 Al McCoy (Alexander Rudolph), US, world champion middleweight 1914-17
 Daniel Mendoza, England, England Champion welterweight and heavyweight 1784–1795, Hall of Fame
 Michael Michaelsen, Denmark, Olympic bronze heavyweight 1928 and European Champion 1930
 Samuel Mosberg, US, Olympic champion lightweight 1920
 Bob Olin, US, world champion light heavyweight 1934-35
 Victor Perez ("Young"), Tunisia, world champion flyweight 1931-32
 Harold Reitman ("The Boxing Doctor"), professional heavyweight, fought while working as surgeon, Golden Gloves champion
 Charlie Phil Rosenberg ("Charles Green"), US, world champion bantamweight 1925-27
 Dana Rosenblatt ("Dangerous"), US, world champion middleweight IBA 1999
 Maxie Rosenbloom ("Slapsie"), US, world champion light heavyweight, wore a Star of David on his trunks, Hall of Fame
 Barney Ross (Dov-Ber Rasofsky), US, world champion lightweight & junior welterweight, Hall of Fame
 Mike Rossman (Michael Albert DiPiano; "The Jewish Bomber"), US, world champion light heavyweight, wore Star of David on trunks
Dmitry Salita ("Star of David"), US, North American Boxing Association champion light welterweight
 Cletus Seldin ("Hebrew Hammer"), US, light welterweight, welterweight, WBC International Silver junior welterweight champion
 Szapsel Rotholc, Poland, flyweight
 Isadore "Corporal Izzy" Schwartz ("The Ghetto Midget"), US, world champion flyweight
 Abe Simon ("Big Abe Simon"), US, Last Jewish fighter to fight for the heavyweight title
 Al Singer ("The Bronx Beauty"), US, world champion lightweight
 Bruce "The Mouse" Strauss, middleweight, only fighter to be knocked out on six continents
 "Lefty" Lew Tendler, US, bantamweight, lightweight, and welterweight; wore a Star of David on his trunks; Hall of Fame
 Sid Terris ("Ghost of the Ghetto"), US, lightweight, wore a Star of David on his trunks
 Matt Wells, England, lightweight champion of Great Britain and world champion welterweight
 Jack "Kid" Wolfe, Russian-born US, superbantumweight
 Victor Zilberman, Romania, welterweight, Olympic bronze medalist

Canoeing

 László Fábián, Hungary, sprint canoeist, Olympic champion (K-2 10,000 meter), 4× world champion (3× K-2 10,000 meter and 1× K-4 10,000 meter) and one silver (K-4 10,000 meter)
 Imre Farkas, Hungary, sprint canoeist, 2× Olympic bronze (C-2 1,000 and 10,000 meter)
Jessica Fox, French-born Australian, slalom canoeist, Olympic gold (C-1 slalom), Olympic silver and bronze (K-1 slalom), world championships gold (C-1 and K-1)
 Myriam Fox-Jerusalmi, France, slalom canoeist, Olympic bronze (K-1 slalom), 5 golds at ICF Canoe Slalom World Championships (2× K-1, 3× K-1 team)
 Klára Fried-Bánfalvi, Hungary, sprint canoeist, Olympic bronze (K-2 500 m), world champion (K-2 500 m)
 Leonid Geishtor, USSR (Belarus), sprint canoeist, Olympic champion (Canadian pairs 1,000 meter)
 Joe Jacobi, US, slalom canoeist, Olympic champion (C-2 slalom)
Michael Kolganov, Soviet (Uzbek)-born Israeli, sprint canoeist, Olympic bronze (K-1 500metre) for Israel; 2× world champion
Anna Pfeffer, Hungary, sprint canoeist, Olympic 2× silver (K-2 500 m), bronze (K-1 500 m); world champion (K-2 500 m), silver (K-4 500 m), 2× bronze (K-2 500)
 Naum Prokupets, Moldovan-born Soviet, sprint canoeist, Olympic bronze (C-2 1,000me), gold (C-2 10,000m) at ICF Canoe Sprint World Championships
 Leon Rotman, Romanian, sprint canoeist, 2× Olympic champion (C-1 10,000m, C-1 1,000m) and bronze (C-1 1,000m), 14 national titles
Shaun Rubenstein, South Africa, canoeist, World Marathon champion 2006

Cricket

 Ben Ashkenazi, Australia (Victorian Bushrangers)
 Ali Bacher, South Africa, batsman and administrator (uncle of Adam Bacher)
 Mike Barnard, England, cricketer
 Ivan Barrow, West Indies, cricketer, only Jew to hit a test century.
Mark Bott, England, cricketer
 Mark Fuzes, Australian all rounder; played for Hong Kong; kept goal for Australian Soccer team
 Dennis Gamsy, South Africa, Test wicket-keeper
Darren Gerard, England, cricketer
 Norman Gordon, South Africa, fast bowler
 Steven Herzberg, English-born Australian, cricketer
 Sid Kiel, South Africa, opening batsman (Western Province)
Michael Klinger, Australia, batsman (Western Warriors)
 Leonard "Jock" Livingston, Australia, cricketer
 Bev Lyon, England, cricketer
 Dar Lyon, England, cricketer (brother of Bev)
 Greg, Jason, and Lara Molins, two brothers and a cousin from the same Irish family
Jon Moss, Australia, allrounder (Victorian Bushrangers)
 Sid O'Linn, South Africa
 John Raphael, England, batsman
 Marshall Rosen, NSW Australia, cricketer and selector
 Lawrence Seeff, South Africa, batsmen
 Maurice Sievers, Australia, lower order batsman and fast-medium bowler
Bensiyon Songavkar, India, cricketer, MVP of 2009 Maccabiah Games cricket tournament
 Fred Susskind, South Africa, Test batsman
 Julien Wiener, Australia, Test cricketer
 Mandy Yachad, South Africa, Test cricketer

Cycling

 Romāns Vainšteins, Latvia, Olympian

Equestrian

Georgina Bloomberg, US, Pan-American bronze
Robert Dover, US, 4× Olympic bronze, 1× world championship bronze (dressage)
Margie Goldstein-Engle, US, world championship silver, Pan American Games gold, silver, and bronze (jumping)
Hermann Mandl, Austria
Edith Master, US, Olympic bronze (dressage)

Fencing

 Henri Anspach, Belgium (épée & foil), Olympic champion
 Paul Anspach, Belgium (épée & foil), 2× Olympic champion
 Norman Armitage (Norman Cohn), US (saber), Olympic bronze, 17× US champion
 Albert "Albie" Axelrod, US (foil), Olympic bronze, 4× US champion
 Péter Bakonyi, Hungary (saber), Olympic 3× bronze
 Tamir Bloom, US (épée), 2× Pan-American silver
 Albert Bogen (Albert Bógathy), Austria (saber), Olympic silver
 Nick Bravin
 Daniel Bukantz, US (foil), 4× US champion
 Eli Dershwitz, US (saber), Junior World Champion, 4× Pan-American champion, US champion, NCAA champion
 Yves Dreyfus, France (épée), Olympic bronze, French champion
 Ilona Elek, Hungary (saber), 2× Olympic champion
Boaz Ellis, Israel (foil), 3× NCAA champion, 5× Israeli champion
Sándor Erdős, Hungary (épée), Olympic champion
 Siegfried "Fritz" Flesch, Austria (saber), Olympic bronze
 Dr. Dezső Földes, Hungary (saber), 2× Olympic champion
 Yuval Freilich, Israel (épée), 2019 European Épée Champion
 Dr. Jenő Fuchs, Hungary (saber), 4× Olympic champion
 Tamás Gábor, Hungary (épée), Olympic champion
 János Garay, Hungary (saber), Olympic champion, silver, bronze, killed by the Nazis
 Dr. Oskar Gerde, Hungary (saber), 2× Olympic champion, killed by the Nazis
 Dr. Sándor Gombos, Hungary (saber), Olympic champion
Vadim Gutzeit, Ukraine (saber), Olympic champion
 Johan Harmenberg, Sweden (épée), Olympic champion
Delila Hatuel, Israel (foil), Olympian, ranked No. 9 in world
Lydia Hatuel-Czuckermann, Israel (foil), 20× Israeli champion
 Dr. Otto Herschmann, Austria (saber), Olympic silver
 Nick Itkin, US (foil), Olympic bronze
Emily Jacobson, US (saber), Junior World Champion, NCAA champion
Sada Jacobson, US (saber), ranked No.  1 in the world, Olympic silver, 2× bronze, 2× world team champion
 Allan Jay, British (épée & foil), Olympic 2× silver, world champion
 Endre Kabos, Hungary (saber), 3× Olympic champion, bronze
 Roman Kantor, Poland (épée), Nordic champion & Soviet champion, killed by the Nazis
 Byron Krieger, US (foil, saber, épée), 2× Olympian, Pan American Games team gold/silver
 Grigory Kriss, Soviet (épée), Olympic champion, 2× silver
 Allan Kwartler, US (saber), 3× Pan American Games champion
 Alexandre Lippmann, France (épée), 2× Olympic champion, 2× silver, bronze
 Helene Mayer, Germany & US (foil), Olympic champion
 Maria Mazina, Russia (épée), Olympic champion, bronze
 Mark Midler, Soviet (foil), 2× Olympic champion
 Noam Mills, Israel (épée), female Junior World Champion
 Armand Mouyal, France (épée), Olympic bronze, world champion
 Claude Netter, France (foil), Olympic champion, silver
 Jacques Ochs, Belgium (épée), Olympic champion
Ayelet Ohayon, Israel (foil), European champion
 Ellen Osiier, Denmark (foil), Olympic champion
 Dr. Ivan Osiier, Denmark (épée, foil, and saber), Olympic silver (épée), 25× Danish champion
 Attila Petschauer, Hungary (saber), 2× team Olympic champion, silver, killed by the Nazis
 Ellen Preis, Austria (foil), Olympic champion, 3× world champion, 17× Austrian champion
 Mark Rakita, Soviet (saber), 2× Olympic champion, 2× silver
 Yakov Rylsky, Soviet (saber), Olympic champion
 Gaston Salmon, Belgium (épée), Olympic champion
 Zoltán Ozoray Schenker, Hungary (saber & foil), Olympic champion, silver, bronze
 Edgar Seligman, British (épée, foil, and saber), Olympic 2× silver (épée), 2× British champion in each weapon
 Sergey Sharikov, Russia (saber), 2× Olympic champion, silver, bronze
 Andre Spitzer, Israel, killed by terrorists
 Jean Stern, France (épée), Olympic champion
Soren Thompson, US (épée), World Team Champion, US Junior Champion, US champion, NCAA champion
 David Tyshler, Soviet (saber), Olympic bronze
 Ildikó Újlaky-Rejtő, Hungary (foil), 2× Olympic champion
 Eduard Vinokurov, Russia (saber), 2× Olympic champion, silver
 Iosif Vitebskiy, Soviet (épée), Olympic silver, 10× national champion
 Maia Weintraub, US (foil), US national champion (2019), 3× gold 2019 European Maccabi Games 
 Lajos Werkner, Hungary (saber), 2× Olympic champion
 George Worth, US (saber), Olympic bronze, US champion, 3× Pan American champion

Field hockey

 Carina Benninga, Netherlands, Olympic champion, bronze
 Giselle Kañevsky, Argentina, Olympic bronze

Figure skating

Max Aaron, US, figure skater, 2013 US men's champion
 Sarah Abitbol, France, figure skater, World Figure Skating Championship bronze
Benjamin Agosto, US, ice dancer, Olympic silver, World Championship silver, bronze
Ilya Averbukh, Russia, ice dancer, Olympic silver, world champion, European champion
Oksana Baiul, Ukraine, figure skater, Olympic gold
Jason Brown, US, figure skater, 2× Junior World Medalist, 2014 US silver, 2014 Olympic bronze (team)
 Alexei Beletski, Ukrainian-born Israeli, ice dancer, Olympian
 Judy Blumberg, US, ice dancer, 3× World Championship bronze
 Aimee Buchanan, US & Israel, figure skater
 Fritzi Burger, Austria, figure skater
Zhan Bush, Russia, figure skater
 Cindy Bortz, US, figure skater, World Junior Champion
 Fritzi Burger, Austria, figure skater, 2× Olympic silver, 2× World Championship silver
 Oleksii Bychenko, Ukrainian-born Israeli, figure skater, 2016 European silver medallist, Olympian
 Alain Calmat, France, figure skater, Olympic silver, World Championship gold, silver, 2× bronze
 Galit Chait, Israel, ice dancer, World Championship bronze, Olympian
Sasha Cohen, US, figure skater, 2006 US Champion, 3× World medalist, 2006 Olympic silver>
Amber Corwin, US, figure skater
Natalia Dubova, USSR, ice dancer
Loren Galler-Rabinowitz, US, ice dancer, competes w/partner David Mitchell; US Championships bronze
 Aleksandr Gorelik, Soviet, pair skater, Olympic silver, World Championship 2× silver, bronze
Melissa Gregory, US, figure skater, ice dancer w/Denis Petukhov, US Championships 3 silvers, 2 bronze
 Natalia Gudina, Ukrainian-born Israeli, figure skater, Olympian
Emily Hughes, US, figure skater, World Junior Figure Skating Championships bronze, US Championships bronze, silver
Sarah Hughes, US, figure skater, Olympic gold, World Championship bronze
 Ronald Joseph, US, figure skater, US Junior Champion, US Championships gold, 2× silver, and bronze, World Championship silver, bronze, 1964 Olympic bronze
 Vivian Joseph, US, figure skater, US Junior Champion, US Championships gold, 2× silver, and bronze, World Championship silver, bronze, 1964 Olympic bronze
 Gennadi Karponossov, Russia, ice dancer & coach, Olympic gold, World Championship 2× gold, silver, 2× bronze
 Felix Kaspar, Austria, figure skater, Olympic bronze
Tamar Katz, US-born Israeli, figure skater
 Evgeni Krasnopolski, Ukraine-born Israel, Olympian
 Lily Kronberger, Hungary, figure skater, World Championship 4× gold, 2× bronze, World Figure Skating Hall of Fame
Dylan Moscovitch, Canada, pairs skater, 2011 Canadian national champion, 2014 Olympic silver (team)
 Emilia Rotter, Hungary, pair skater, World Championship 4× gold, silver, 2× Olympic bronze
 Louis Rubenstein, Canada, figure skater, (pre-Olympic) world champion, World Figure Skating Hall of Fame
Lionel Rumi, Israel, ice dancer
Sergei Sakhnovsky, Israel, ice dancer with Galit Chait, World Championship bronze, Olympian
Daniel Samohin, Israel, figure skater, 2016 World Junior Champion; former junior world record holder (free skate), Olympian
 Michael Seibert, US, ice dancer, US Figure Skating Championships 5× gold, World Figure Skating Championships 3× bronze
 Robert Shmalo, US, ice dancer
 Julia Shapiro, Russia-born Israel, pair skater, World Junior bronze
 Michael Shmerkin, Soviet-born Israeli, figure skater
Simon Shnapir, Russian-born US, pairs skater, 2× US national champion (2013 & 2014), 2014 Olympic bronze (team)
 Igor Shpilband, Soviet, ice dancer, World Junior Championship gold, silver; coach to several world champion teams
 Jamie Silverstein, US, figure skater, ice dancer w/Ryan O'Meara, US Championships bronze
Irina Slutskaya, Russia, figure skater, Olympic silver & bronze, World Championship 2× gold, 3× silver & 1× bronze, 4× Russian champion, 7× European champion
Maxim Staviski, Russian-born Bulgarian, ice dancer, World Championship gold, silver, bronze
 László Szollás, Hungary, pair skater, World Championship gold & silver, 2× Olympic bronze
Isabella Tobias, US-born Israeli ice dancer, represented Lithuania at 2014 Winter Olympics. Currently representing Israel.
Alexandra Zaretski, Belarusian-born Israeli, ice dancer, Olympian
Roman Zaretski, Belarusian-born Israeli, ice dancer, Olympian

Golf

Amy Alcott, US, LPGA Tour, World Golf Hall of Fame
 Herman Barron, US, PGA Tour
Laetitia Beck, Israel, Israeli champion & 3× Maccabiah Games gold, LPGA Tour
Daniel Berger, US, PGA Tour
 Erica Blasberg, US, LPGA Tour
Bruce Fleisher, US, PGA Tour
Paul Friedlander, Eswatini, Sunshine Tour
Max Homa, US, 2013 NCAA Division I Men's Golf Champion, PGA Tour
Asher Iyasu, Ethiopia-born Israel
Jonathan Kaye, US, PGA Tour
Skip Kendall, US, Champions Tour
Alexander Lévy, France, European Tour
David Lipsky, US, Asian Tour
Sam Little, England, European Tour
David Merkow, US, Northwestern University, 2006 Big Ten Golfer of the Year
Rob Oppenheim, US, PGA Tour
Corey Pavin, US, PGA Tour and Champions Tour (converted to Christianity)
Morgan Pressel, US, LPGA Tour
Monte Scheinblum, US, 1992 US & World Long Drive Champion
Zohar Sharon, Israel
Tony Sills, US, PGA Tour
Ben Silverman, Canada, PGA Tour

Gymnastics

 Ruth Abeles, Israel, Olympian (artistic gymnast)
 Estella Agsteribbe, Netherlands, Olympic champion (team combined exercises), killed by the Nazis in Auschwitz
 Lilia Akhaimova, Russia, Olympic gold artistic (team all-around) gymnast at the 2020 Summer Olympics
 Linoy Ashram, Israel, Olympic gold (rhythmic gymnast) and 6× World Championships silver
 Yana Batyrshina, Russia, Olympic silver (rhythmic gymnast)
 Alyssa Beckerman, US, national champion (balance beam), 2 silver & bronze (uneven bars)
 Valery Belenky, USSR/Azerbaijan/Germany, Olympic champion (team combined exercises), bronze (individual combined exercises)
 Ralli Ben-Yehuda, Israel, Olympian (artistic gymnast)
 Moran Buzovski, Israel, Olympian (rhythmic gymnast)
 Elka de Levie, Netherlands, Olympic champion (team combined exercises)
Artem Dolgopyat, Ukrainian-born Israeli, Olympic gold (artistic gymnast – floor) for Israel
 Olena Dvornichenko, Israel/Ukraine, rhythmic gymnastics
 Philip Erenberg, US, Olympic silver (Indian clubs)
 Alfred Flatow, Germany, 3× Olympic champion (parallel bars, team parallel bars, team horizontal bar), silver (horizontal bar)
 Gustav Felix Flatow, Germany, 2× Olympic champion (team parallel bars, team horizontal bar)
 Samu Fóti, Hungary, Olympic silver (team combined exercises)
 Limor Friedman, Israel, Olympian (artistic gymnast)
 Mitch Gaylord, US, Olympic champion (team), silver (vaulting), 2× bronze (rings, parallel bars)
 Imre Gellért, Hungary, Olympic silver (team combined exercises)
 Brian Ginsberg, US, 2x Pan-American champion
 Nancy Goldsmith, Israel, Olympian (artistic gymnast)
 Maria Gorokhovskaya, USSR, Olympic 2× champion (all-around individual exercises, team combined exercises), 5× silver (vault, asymmetrical bars, balance beam, floor exercise, team exercises with portable apparatus)
 Abie Grossfeld, US, 8× Pan American champion, 7× Maccabiah champion, coach
 George Gulack, US, Olympic champion (flying rings)
 Miriam Kara, Israel, Olympian (artistic gymnast)
 Ágnes Keleti, Hungary, 5× Olympic champion (2× floor exercise, asymmetrical bars, floor exercise, balance beam, team exercise with portable apparatus), 3× silver (2× team combined exercises, individual combined exercises), 2× bronze (asymmetrical bars, team exercises with portable apparatus), International Gymnastics Hall of Fame
 Alice Kertész, Hungary, Olympic champion (team, portable apparatus), silver (team); world silver (team)
 Natalia Laschenova, USSR, Olympic champion (team)
 Ya'akov Levi, Israel, Olympian (artistic gymnast)
 Tatiana Lysenko, USSR/Ukraine, 2× Olympic champion (balance beam, team combined exercises), bronze (horse vault)
 Valeria Maksyuta, Ukraine/Israel, multiple World Cup medalist, Israeli Olympian, Maccabiah Games champion
 Phoebe Mills, US, Olympic bronze (balance beam)
 Abraham Mok, Netherlands
 Yohanan Moyal, Israel, Olympian (artistic gymnast)
 Helena Nordheim, Netherlands, Olympic champion (team combined exercises), killed by the Nazis in Sobibór
 Mikhail Perelman, USSR, Olympic champion (team combined exercises)
 Katerina Pisetsky, Israel/Ukraine, rhythmic gymnast
 Anna Polak, Netherlands, Olympic champion (team combined exercises), killed by the Nazis in Sobibór
 Vladimir Portnoi, USSR, Olympic silver (team combined exercises) and bronze (long horse vault)
 Aly Raisman, US, Olympic champion (artistic gymnast; floor 2012, team combined exercises: 2012, 2016), silver (all-around, floor: 2016), bronze (balance beam); world gold (team: 2011, 2015), silver (team: 2010), and bronze (floor exercise: 2011)
 Yulia Raskina, Belarus, Olympic silver (rhythmic gymnastics)
 Lihie Raz, US/Israel, European Championship bronze (floor), Olympian artistic gymnast for Israel
Neta Rivkin, Israel, world bronze (rhythmic gymnastics; hoop)
 Irina Risenzon, Hungary-born Israel, Olympian (rhythmic gymnast)
 Monica Rokhman, US, Olympian (rhythmic gymnast)
 Maria Savenkov, Israel/Russia, rhythmic gymnast
 Samantha Shapiro, US, 2x Pan-American champion (artistic gymnast)
Alexander Shatilov, Uzbekistan/Israel, world bronze, European champion (artistic gymnast; floor exercise)
 Yelena Shushunova, USSR, Olympic 2× champion (all-around, team), silver (balance beam), bronze (uneven bars)
 Judijke Simons, Netherlands, Olympic champion (team combined exercises), killed by the Nazis in Sobibór
 Samantha Smith, Canada, Olympian (trampoline)
 Kerri Strug, US, Olympic champion (team combined exercises), bronze (team combined exercises)
 Victoria Veinberg Filanovsky, Russia/Israel, youth Olympian (rhythmic gymnast) for Israel
 Rahel Vigdozchik, Israel, rhythmic gymnast
 Veronika Vitenberg, Israel/Belarus, rhythmic gymnast
 Julie Zetlin, US, 2010 US champion, rhythmic gymnastics
 Valerie Zimring, US, 1984 US National Champion, 5× Maccabiah Champion (rhythmic gymnastics)

Ice hockey

 Rudi Ball, Germany, right wing, Olympic bronze, world runner-up, bronze, IIHF Hall of Fame
 Andrew Berenzweig, US, defenseman (NHL)
 Max Birbraer, Russia/Kazakhstan; lived & played in Israel; 1st Israeli drafted by NHL team (NHL)
 Austin Block, US, center (free agent)
Jonathon Blum, US, defenseman (Färjestad BK)
 Ross Brooks, Canada, goaltender (NHL)
 Mike Brown, US, right wing (NHL)
 Hy Buller, Canada-born US, All-Star defenseman (NHL)
 André Burakovsky, Austria-born Sweden, left wing (Seattle Kraken)
 Robert Burakovsky, Sweden, right wing (NHL)
 Andrew Calof, Canada, center (Schwenninger Wild Wings)
Michael Cammalleri, Canada, left wing (NHL)
Carter Camper, US, center (Leksands IF)
 Jakob Chychrun, US/Canada, defenseman (Arizona Coyotes)
Colby Cohen, US, defenseman (NHL)
 Olivier Dame-Malka, Canada-born France, defenseman (Rødovre Mighty Bulls)
 Sara DeCosta, US, goaltender, Olympic gold and silver, 2000 & 2002 USA Hockey Women's Player of the Year Award
 Jason Demers, Canada, defenseman (Ak Bars Kazan)
 Justin Duberman, US, right wing (NHL)
 Steve Dubinsky, Canada, center (NHL)

Alon Eizenman, Canada-born Israel, center
Oren Eizenman, Canada-born Israel, center
David Elsner, Germany, right wing (ERC Ingolstadt)
 Sam Faber, US, forward
 Adam Fox, US, defenseman (New York Rangers)
 Kaleigh Fratkin, Canada, defenseman (Boston Pride)
 Mark Friedman, Canada, defenseman (Pittsburgh Penguins)
 Chelsey Goldberg, US, forward (Boston Blades)
 Jørn Goldstein, Norway, goaltender, Olympian and national team, awarded the Gold Puck as best player of the season
Dov Grumet-Morris, US, goaltender (AHL)
Cole Guttman, US, center (Chicago Blackhawks)
Jeff Halpern, US, center (NHL)
 Gizzy Hart, Canada, left wing (NHL)
 Mike Hartman, US, left wing (NHL)
 Karel Hartmann, Czechoslovakia (Sparta Prague), left wing, Olympic bronze medal, vice-president of the International Ice Hockey Federation.
Adam Henrich, Canada, left wing/center
Michael Henrich, Canada, right wing, 1st Jewish player drafted in NHL 1st round (by Edmonton Oilers)
Eric Himelfarb, Canada, center (HC Thurgau)
Kim Hirschovits, Finland, center
Josh Ho-Sang, Canada, right wing (Toronto Marlies)
 Ellen Weinberg-Hughes, US, defenseman, World Championship silver medal
 Jack Hughes, US, center, (New Jersey Devils), 2019 NHL Entry Draft #1 overall pick
 Quinn Hughes, US, defenseman (Vancouver Canucks)
 Luke Hughes, US, defenseman, (University of Michigan, New Jersey Devils)
Zach Hyman, Canada, left wing/center (Edmonton Oilers)
 Peter Ing, Canada, goaltender (NHL)
 Joe Ironstone, Canada, goaltender (NHL)
 Max Kaminsky, Canada, center (NHL)
Evan Kaufmann, US, forward
 Mikhail Kravets, Russia, right wing (NHL)
 Luke Kunin, US, center (San Jose Sharks)
 Alfred Kuchevsky, Soviet, defenseman, Olympic champion, bronze
 Max Labovitch, Canada, right wing (NHL)
Brendan Leipsic, Canada, left wing (Metallurg Magnitogorsk)
 Devon Levi, Canada, goaltender (Buffalo Sabres)
David Levin, Israeli-born Canadian, left wing, 1st overall 2015 OHL draft selection (Bratislava Capitals)
 Alex Levinsky, Canada, defenseman (NHL)
 Grant Lewis, US, defenseman (NHL)
 David Littman, US, goaltender (NHL)
 Yuri Lyapkin, Soviet, defenseman
 Tyler Maxwell, US, center (Alaska Aces)
David Meckler, US, left wing
Jacob Micflikier, Canada, forward (free agent)
David Nemirovsky, Canada, right wing (NHL)
Eric Nystrom, US, left wing, son of former NHL player Bob Nystrom (NHL)
 Cory Pecker, Canada, right wing (Nationalliga B's Switzerland team Lausanne HC), drafted 6th round by Calgary Flames in 1999
 Bob Plager, Canada, defenseman (NHL; converted to Judaism)
 Chase Priskie, US, defenseman (Buffalo Sabres)
Dylan Reese, US, defenseman (various NHL teams, HV71))
 Steve Richmond, US, defenseman (NHL)
 Maurice Roberts, US, goaltender (NHL)
 Samuel Rothschild, Canada, left wing (NHL)
François Rozenthal, France, right wing
Maurice Rozenthal, France, right wing
 Mathieu Schneider, US, defenseman (NHL)
Eliezer Sherbatov, Israeli-Canadian, left wing (HC Mariupol)
Trevor Smith, Canada, center (NHL)
Brett Sterling, US, left wing (NHL)
 Ronnie Stern, Canada, right wing (NHL)
 Nate Thompson, US, center (Philadelphia Flyers)
Josh Tordjman, Canada, goaltender (NHL)
Márton Vas, Hungary, right wing
 Mike Veisor, Canada, goaltender (NHL)
Jake Walman, Canada-US, defenseman (Detroit Red Wings)
David Warsofsky, US, defenseman (ERC Ingolstadt)
Ozzy Wiesblatt, Canada, right wing (Prince Albert Raiders, San Jose Sharks)
Ethan Werek, Canada, forward (HC Kunlun Red Star)
 Brian Wilks, Canada, center (NHL)
 Bob Winograd, Canada, defenseman, first Jewish player selected in the NHL draft
 Bernie Wolfe, Canada, goaltender (NHL)
Victor "Chick" Zamick, Canada, center (British Ice Hockey Hall of Fame) 
 Larry Zeidel, Canada, defenseman (NHL)
 Alexei Zhitnik, Ukraine-born Russia, defenseman (NHL)
Jason Zucker, US, left wing (Pittsburgh Penguins)

Judo

Yael Arad, Israel, 1992 Olympic silver (light-middleweight)
 Mark Berger, Canada, Olympic silver & bronze (heavyweight)
 Robert Berland, US, Olympic silver (middleweight)
 Ārons Bogoļubovs, USSR, Olympic bronze (lightweight)
 James Bregman, US, Olympic bronze (middleweight)
 Aaron Cohen, US 
Yarden Gerbi, Israel, 2016 Olympic bronze (under 63 kg)
Maya Goshen, Israel, 2022 world bronze medalist for mixed teams (men and women)
Felipe Kitadai, Brazil, Olympic bronze (60 kg)
 Daniela Krukower, Israel/Argentina, world champion (under 63 kg)
Charlee Minkin, US, Pan American women's champion (half lightweight division; under 52 kg)
Sagi Muki, Israel, 2015 & 2018 European champion, 2019 World Champion (under 81 kg), 2022 World bronze medalist for mixed teams (men and women)
 Moshe Ponte, Israel, Olympian (half-middleweight)
Gefen Primo, Israel, 2018 & 2021 European bronze medalist, 2021 World bronze medalist (under 52 kg)
Shira Rishony, Israel, -48 kg
Or "Ori" Sasson, Israel, 2016 and 2020 Olympic bronze medalist
Alice Schlesinger, Israel-Britain, World Judo Championships bronze;  European junior champion (under 63 kg)
Oren Smadja, Israel, 1992 Olympic bronze medalist (lightweight)
Ehud Vaks, Israel (half-lightweight)
 Gal Yekutiel, Israel, European bronze medalist 2× Olympian
Ariel "Arik" Ze'evi, Israel, 2004 Olympic bronze medalist (100 kg)
Israel national judo team, Israel, 2020 Olympics bronze for mixed teams (men and women)

Lacrosse

Max Seibald, US (Philadelphia Wings)

Mixed martial arts

Sarah Avraham, Indian-born Israeli kickboxer, 2014 Women's World Thai-Boxing Champion; 57–63 kilos (125–140 pounds) weight class
Cyril Benzaquen, France, World Champion of Kickboxing, World Champion of Muaythai, light heavyweight
Patrick Bittan, France, first French to medal at an International Brazilian Jiu-Jitsu Federation event (IBJJF Pans 1999), multiple times Champion of France of BJJ. Belgium International Grappling Champion (2000), US Open 2nd Place (1998 blue), São Paulo State Championship 2nd Place (2003), Pan American IBJJF 3rd Place (1999 blue)
Nili Block, Israeli world champion kickboxer and Muay Thai fighter; 60 kg (132 pound) weight class
Johann Fauveau, France, World Champion of Kickboxing, super welterweight
Fabrice Fourment, France, Vis-European Champion of Kyokushinkaï Karate (2000), winner of the first Scandinavian Open (1998), winner of the North American Championship (2003), seven times France's Champion, heavyweight
Ilya Grad, Israel, lightweight Muay Thai boxing champion
Emily Kagan, US, UFC fighter in the women's strawweight division; competed in season 20 of The Ultimate Fighter
Noad "Neo" Lahat, Israel, featherweight MMA (UFC)
Natan Levy*, Israel, featherweight mixed martial artist in the UFC
Ido Pariente, Israel, lightweight Pankration World Champion
Yulia Sachkov, Israel, world champion kickboxer
Marina Shafir, Moldova-US
Rory Singer, US, middleweight fighter from The Ultimate Fighter 3

Motorsport

Motorsport

 Woolf Barnato, UK, x3 24 hours of Le Mans winner
 Brandon Bernstein, US, drag racing driver and son of Kenny Bernstein
 Kenny Bernstein, US, drag racing driver and former NASCAR owner
 Jo Bonnier, Sweden, Formula One and Sports Car driver
 François Cevert (born "Albert Goldenberg", Christian mother), France, Formula One driver
 Tim Coronel, Netherlands, Twin brother of Tom
 Tom Coronel, Netherlands, World Touring Car Championship
 Alon Day, Israel, Whelen Euro Series
 Jon Denning, US, NASCAR driver and National Jewish Sports Hall of Fame and Museum inductee
 René Dreyfus, France, Grand Prix racer
Thomas Erdos, Brazil, Sports Cars, LMP2 champion 2007, 2010, British GT Champion 2002, British Formula Renault champion 1990
 Mário Haberfeld, Brazil, Champ Car driver
 Kyle Krisiloff, US, NASCAR and USAC driver
 Steve Krisiloff, US, USAC and CART Championship Car driver
 Eric Lichtenstein, Argentina, GP3 driver
 Stirling Moss, UK, Formula One driver
 Paul Newman, US, motorsport team owner and driver; actor
 Chanoch Nissany, Israel, Formula One test-driver, father of Roy Nissany
Roy Nissany, Israel-France, Formula V8 3.5, son of Chanoch Nissany
 Peter Revson, US, Formula One driver
 Mauri Rose, US, Indy driver, Indy 500 winner
 Ricardo Rosset, Brazil, Formula One driver
 Eddie Sachs, US, 8× starter of the Indianapolis 500, 1957–64, taking pole position in 1960 and 1961, with his best finish being second in 1961
 Ian Scheckter, South Africa, Formula One driver (brother of Jody Scheckter and uncle of Tomas Scheckter)
 Jody Scheckter, South Africa, Formula One driver,  Formula One World Drivers champion (brother of Ian Scheckter and father of Tomas Scheckter)
 Tomas Scheckter, South Africa, Indy Racing League driver
 Lance Stroll, Canada-Belgium, Formula One driver, second youngest podium finisher in F1 history, and youngest rookie podium. Son of Lawrence Stroll
 Sheila van Damm, British rally driver
 Lionel Van Praag, Australian motorcycle Speedway World Champion
 Robert Shwartzman, Russia-Israel, racing driver, competed in the FIA Formula 2 Championship for 2020 and 2021 where he finished 4th and 2nd respectively. Current Ferrari reserve driver

Rowing

Jean Klein, France, Olympic silver
Károly Levitzky, Hungary, Olympic bronze
Allen Rosenberg, US, champion and Olympics coach 
 Donald Spero, US multi-collegiate (Cornell 8+) and national champion (1×), multi-European medalist (1×, 2×), World champion (1×), Henley Royal Regatta champion (1×), Gold Cup champion (1×), US Olympian (1×), and a founder of the National Rowing Foundation
Josh West, American-born British, men's eight, Olympic silver, 2× World Rowing Championships silver and one bronze

Rugby league

 Lewis Harris, England, English rugby league
 Wilf Rosenberg, South African rugby union, and later rugby league
 Albert Rosenfeld, Australia, five-eighth, Australian rugby league
 Ian Rubin, Ukraine/Australia, Russia national team
Geoff Selby, Australia, St George Dragons
 Mark Shulman, Australian rugby league

Rugby union

 Nathan Amos, 
 Louis Babrow, South Africa,  national team
 Leo Camron, South Africa/Israel; helped introduce rugby to Israel
 A.S. Cohen, England (Cambridge University RFC)
 Hacjivah Dayimani, South africa, flanker, Stormers
 Nate Ebner, 2016 US Olympic Team at Rio de Janeiro
 Okey Geffin, South Africa, forward,  national team
 Samuel Goodman, US, player and manager of gold-winning US Olympic team
 Chaya Leib Herzovitz, Turkey-Poland, Stade Français
 David Horwitz, Australian rugby union Fly-half and Centre.
 Joe Kaminer, South Africa,  national team
 Josh Kronfeld, New Zealand, flanker,  national team
 Aaron Liffchak, England, prop
 Shawn Lipman, South Africa/US, US national team
 Alan Menter, England/South Africa,  national team
 Cecil Moss, South Africa,  national team
 Sydney Nomis,  national team
 John Raphael, Belgium/England,  national team
 Wilf Rosenberg, South Africa; rugby union, and later rugby league
 Myer Rosenblum, South Africa/Australia, flanker, 
 Rupert Rosenblum, Australia, Australia national team
 Albert Rosenfeld, Australian rugby player
 Fred Smollan, South Africa,  national team
 Dr. Bethel Solomons, Ireland, forward,  national team
 Joel Stransky, South Africa, fly-half,  national team, kicked winning points in 1995 Rugby World Cup final
 Zack Test, US, wing/fullback, US national sevens team
 Morris Zimerman, 
 Dallen Stanford, US, flyhalf/fullback, US national sevens team BH

Sailing

 Daniel Adler, Brazil, Olympic silver (yachting; sailing class)
 Eldad Amir, Israel, sailor
Jo Aleh, New Zealand, sailor, Olympic champion (470 class), world champion (420 class)
 Yehuda Atedji, Israel, sailor
 Shimshon Brokman, Israel, sailor
 Tony Bullimore, British, yachtsman
 Vered Buskila, Israel, sailor
 Zefania Carmel, Israel, yachtsman, world champion (420 class)
Don Cohan, US, Olympic bronze (yachting; dragon class)
Maayan Davidovich, Israel, windsurfer
Nufar Edelman, Israel, sailor
 Larry Ellison, US, sailor
 Anat Fabrikant, Israel, sailor
Gal Fridman, Israel, windsurfer, 2004 Olympic gold medalist (Israel's first gold medalist), 1996 Olympic bronze medalist (Mistral class)
 Eitan Friedlander, Israel, sailor, world championship gold
 Robert Halperin, US, yachting (star-class)
 Amit Inbar, Israel, windsurfer
 Peter Jaffe, Great Britain, Olympic silver (yachting; star-class)
 Nike Kornecki, Italy-born Israel, 470-class
Lee Korzits, Israel, windsurfer, 4× world champion (RS:X)
 Lydia Lazarov, Israel, yachtsman, world champion (420 class)
 Valentyn Mankin, Soviet/Ukraine, only sailor in Olympic history to win gold medals in three different classes (yachting: finn class, tempest class, and star class), silver (yachting, tempest class)
Nimrod Mashiah, Israel, windsurfer, ranked No.  1 in world (RS:X; 2010)
Mark Mendelblatt, US, Olympic sailor, 2× world silver (laser and sunfish), bronze (laser)
 Robert Mosbacher, US, world championship gold & silver (dragon class), gold (soling class), and bronze (5.5 metre class)
 Ran Shantal, Israel, 470-class, Olympian
 Nir Shental, Israel, 470-class, Olympian
 Dan Torten, Israel, 470-class, Olympian
 Ran Torten, Israel, 470-class, Olympian
Shahar Tzuberi, Israel, windsurfer, 2008 Olympic bronze medalist (RS:X discipline); 2009 & 2010 European Windsurf champion
Yoav Cohen, Israel, windsurfer, fourth place at the 2020 Summer Olympics
 Eli Zuckerman, Israel, yachtsman, Olympian

Shooting

Morris Fisher, US, 5× Olympic champion (2× team free rifle; 300 m free rifle, 3 positions; 600 m free rifle; team 300 m military rifle, prone)
 Guy Starik, Israel, world record in 50 m rifle prone
Lev Vainshtein, USSR (Russia), 3× team world champion (25 m & 50 m pistol) and Olympic bronze medalist (300 m rifle)

Skeleton

 Adam (AJ) Edelman, US-Israel, 4× National Champion, 2018 Olympian

Skiing and snowboarding

Arielle Gold, US, Olympic bronze snowboarder, world champion
Taylor Gold, US, snowboarder
Jared Goldberg, US, Olympic alpine skier, US Junior Championships combined champion, US Championships downhill champion
Drew Goldsack, Canada, cross country skier, 2× Olympian
 Anna Segal, Australia, Olympic freestyle slopestyle skier, 2× world champion
Virgile Vandeput, Israel, Belgian-born, slalom & giant slalom skier, Olympian

Speed skating

 Vladislav Bykanov, Ukraine-born Israel, short-track, Olympian and Silver European Championship 
Andy Gabel, US, Olympic silver (5,000 meter short track relay)
 Rafayel Grach, USSR, Olympic silver (500 m), bronze (500 m)
 Irving Jaffee, US, 2× Olympic champion (5,000m, 10,000m), world records (mile, 25 miles)
 Emery Lehman, US, Olympic bronze (Team Pursuit)
Dan Weinstein, US, short-track, 3× world champion (2× team 1,000m, team short-track 5,000m)

Softball

 Tamara Statman, Israeli National Softball Team

Surfing

 Makua Rothman, US, Big Wave World Champion
 Shaun Tomson, South Africa, world champion
 Anat Lelior, Israel, 2020 Summer Olympics

Swimming

 Margarete "Grete" Adler, Austria, Olympic bronze (4 × 100m freestyle relay)
 Vadim Alexeev, Kazakhstan-born Israeli, breaststroke
 Jessica Antiles, US
 Semyon Belits-Geiman, USSR, Olympic silver (400 m freestyle relay) and bronze (800 m freestyle relay); world record in men's 800m freestyle
 Adi Bichman, Israel (400 m and 800m freestyle, 400m medley)
 Damián Blaum, Argentina, open water
 Gérard Blitz, Belgium, Olympic bronze (100 m backstroke), International Swimming Hall of Fame
 Yoav Bruck, Israel (50 m freestyle and 100m freestyle), Israel (50m freestyle and 100m freestyle)
 Tiffany Cohen, US, 2× Olympic champion (400 m and 800m freestyle); 2× Pan American champion (400m and 800m freestyle), International Swimming Hall of Fame
Anthony Ervin, US, Olympic champion (50m freestyle), silver (400 m freestyle relay); 2× world champion (50 m freestyle, 100m freestyle)
 Yoav Gath, Israel (100 and 200 m backstroke)
Scott Goldblatt, US, Olympic champion (4 × 200m freestyle relay), silver (800 m freestyle relay); world championships silver (4 × 200m freestyle), bronze (4 × 200m freestyle)
 Eran Cohen Groumi, Israel (100 and 200 m backstroke, 100m butterfly)
 Andrea Gyarmati, Hungary, Olympic silver (100 m backstroke) and bronze (100 m butterfly); world championships bronze (200 m backstroke), International Swimming Hall of Fame
 Alfréd Hajós (born "Arnold Guttmann"), Hungary, 3× Olympic champion (100m freestyle, 800m freestyle relay, 1,500m freestyle), International Swimming Hall of Fame
 Michael "Miki" Halika, Israel, 200m butterfly, 200m and 400m individual medley
 Judith Haspel (born "Judith Deutsch"), Austrian-born Israeli, held every Austrian women's middle and long-distance freestyle record in 1935, refused to represent Austria in 1936 Summer Olympics along with Ruth Langer and Lucie Goldner, protesting Hitler, stating, "I refuse to enter a contest in a land which so shamefully persecutes my people."
 Otto Herschmann, Austria, Olympic 2-silver (in fencing/team sabre and 100m freestyle); arrested by Nazis, and died in Izbica concentration camp
 Amit Ivry, Israel, Olympic semi-finalist (200 metre individual medley)
Lenny Krayzelburg, Ukrainian-born US, 4× Olympic champion (100 m backstroke, 200m backstroke, twice 4 × 100m medley relay); 3× world champion (100m and 200m backstroke, 4 × 100m medley) and 2× silver (4 × 100m medley, 50m backstroke); 3 world records (50m, 100m, and 200m backstroke)
 Herbert Klein, Germany, Olympic bronze (200 m breaststroke); 3 world records
 Dan Kutler, US-born Israeli (100 m butterfly, 4 × 100m medley relay)
 Ruth Langer Lawrence, Austria; along with Judith Haspel and Lucie Goldner refused to represent Austria in 1936 Summer Olympics, their protest stating "We do not boycott Olympia, but Berlin".
 Katie Ledecky, US, 7× Olympic gold, 15× world champion, the most in history for a female swimmer
Keren Leibovitch, Israeli Paralympic swimmer, 3× world champion, 3 world records (100m and 200m backstroke; 100m freestyle), and 8× Paralympic medal winner
Jason Lezak, US, 4× Olympic champion (twice 4 × 100m medley relay, 4 × 400m medley relay, 4 × 100 freestyle relay), silver (400 m freestyle relay), 2× bronze (100m freestyle, 4 × 100m freestyle relay); 8× world champion (4× 4 × 100m medley, 3× 4 × 100m freestyle, 100m freestyle), silver (4 × 100m medley), bronze (4 × 100m freestyle)
 Klara Milch, Austria, Olympic bronze (4 × 100m freestyle relay)
 József Munk, Hungary, Olympic silver (4 × 200m freestyle relay)
 Alfred "Artem" Nakache, France; world record (200m breaststroke), one-third of French 2× world record (3 × 100m relay team); imprisoned by Nazis in Auschwitz, where his wife and daughter were killed
 Paul Neumann, Austria, Olympic champion (500m freestyle)
 Maxim Podoprigora, Ukrainian-born Austrian Olympic swimmer
Sarah Poewe, South African-born German, Olympic bronze (4 × 100m medley relay)
 Marilyn Ramenofsky, US, Olympic silver (400 m freestyle); 3× world record for 400m freestyle
 Jeremy Reingold, South African, 200m individual medley world record, South South African SA under-21 rugby team
 Keena Rothhammer, US, Olympic champion (800 m freestyle) and bronze (200 m freestyle); world champion (200 m freestyle) and silver (400 m freestyle), International Swimming Hall of Fame
 Albert Schwartz, US, Olympic bronze (100 m freestyle)
 Otto Scheff (born "Otto Sochaczewsky"), Austria, Olympic champion (400 m freestyle) and 2× bronze (400 m freestyle, 1,500m freestyle)
 Mark Spitz, US, Olympic champion (9 golds (400 m freestyle relay twice, 800m freestyle relay twice, 100m freestyle, 200m freestyle, 100m butterfly, 200m butterfly, 400m medley relay), 1 silver (100 m butterfly), 1 bronze (100 m freestyle)), has the second-most gold medals won in a single Olympic Games (7); 5× Pam Am champion; 10× Maccabiah champion; world records (100m and 200m freestyle, 100- and 200m butterfly), International Swimming Hall of Fame
 Josephine Sticker, Austria, Olympic bronze (4 × 100m freestyle relay)
Tal Stricker, Israel (100m and 200m breaststroke, 4 × 100m medley relay)
 András Székely, Hungary, Olympic silver (200 m breaststroke) and bronze (4 × 200m freestyle relay); died in a Nazi concentration camp
 Éva Székely, Hungary, Olympic champion & silver (200 m breaststroke); International Swimming Hall of Fame; mother of Andrea Gyarmati
 Lejzor Ilja Szrajbman, Poland, Olympic 4 × 200m freestyle relay; killed by the Nazis in Majdanek concentration camp
 Judit Temes, Hungary, Olympic champion (4 × 100m freestyle), bronze (100 m freestyle)
Dara Torres, US, Olympic 4× champion (400 m freestyle relay, 4 × 100m freestyle relay twice, 4 × 100m medley relay), 4× silver (50 m freestyle, 2× 4 × 100m freestyle, 4 × 100m medley relay), 4× bronze (50 m freestyle, 100m freestyle, 100m butterfly, 4 × 100m freestyle relay, 4 × 100m medley relay); world championship silver (4 × 100m freestyle); Pan American champion (4 × 100m freestyle)
 Eithan Urbach, Israel, backstroke, European championship silver & bronze (100 m backstroke)
 Otto Wahle, Austria/US, 2× Olympic silver (1,000 m freestyle, 200m obstacle race) and bronze (400 m freestyle); International Swimming Hall of Fame
Garrett Weber-Gale, US, 2× Olympic champion (4 × 100m freestyle relay, 4 × 100m medley relay); world champion (3× 4 × 100m freestyle, 4 × 100m medley), silver (4 × 200m freestyle)
 Wendy Weinberg, US, Olympic bronze (800 m freestyle); Pan American champion (800 m freestyle)
Claire Weinstein, US, world champion (women's 4 × 200m freestyle relay)
Ben Wildman-Tobriner, US, Olympic champion (4 × 100m freestyle relay); world champion (2× 4 × 100m freestyle, 50m freestyle)
Wally Wolf, US, Olympic champion ( freestyle relay)
 Imre Zachár, Hungary, Olympic silver (4 × 200m freestyle relay)

Table tennis

 Ruth Aarons, US, 2× world champion
 Ivan Andreadis, Czechoslovakia, 9x world champion
 Viktor Barna (born "Győző Braun"), Hungary/Britain, 22× world champion, International Table Tennis Foundation Hall of Fame ("ITTFHoF")
 Laszlo Bellak, Hungary/US, 7× world champion, ITTFHoF
 Dora Beregi, Hungarian 2× world champion
 Richard Bergmann, Austria/Britain, 7× world champion, ITTFHoF
 Benny Casofsky, English Swaythling Cup player
 Alojzy Ehrlich, Poland, 3× silver and 1× bronze in the World Championships; incarcerated by the Nazis in Auschwitz; represented France after 1945
 Shimcha Finkelstein, Poland, World bronze medallist and first champion of Israel
 Magda Gál, Hungarian, 20 world championship medals
 Sandor Glancz, Hungarian, 4× world champion
 Gregory Grinberg, Moldova/USSR, 4× USSR champion (singles, doubles, mix)
 Tibor Házi, Hungarian three times world champion
 Jeff Ingber, English international
 Eddie Kantar, American bridge author; only person ever to have played in a World Bridge Championship and a World Table Tennis Championship
 Gertrude "Traute" Kleinová, Czechoslovakia, 3× world champion, incarcerated by the Nazis in Theresienstadt and Auschwitz
 Erwin Kohn, Austrian world champion
 Marina Kravchenko, Ukrainian-born Israeli, Soviet and Israel national teams
 Pavel Löwy, Czech world bronze medallist and believed to have died in concentration camp
 Hyman Lurie, English three times world bronze medallist
 Dick Miles, US, 10× US champion
 Ivor Montagu, Britain, national team and founder of the International Table Tennis Federation
 Leah Neuberger (Thall), "Miss Ping", US, 29× US champion
 Marty Reisman, US, 3× national champion
 Angelica Rozeanu (Adelstin), Romania/Israel, 17× world champion, ITTFHoF
 Samuel Schieff, Poland world bronze medallist and later Israel international
 Sol Schiff, US double world champion
 Anna Sipos, Hungary, 11× world champion, ITTFHoF
 Miklos Szabados, Hungary/Australia, 15× world champion
 Pablo Tabachnik, Argentina, national team
 Thelma Thall, US, 2× world table tennis champion
 David Zalcberg, Australia, national team

Taekwondo

 Mitchell Bobrow, USA, All American Open Grand Champion 1969, Madison Square Garden
 Avishag Semberg, Israel, Olympic bronze medalist 2020 (49 kg)

Tennis

 Jay Berger, US, USTA boys 18s singles champion, highest world ranking No. 7
 Gilad Bloom, Israel
Madison Brengle, US
 Gail Brodsky, US
 Elise Burgin, US, highest world singles ranking No.  22, highest world doubles ranking No.  8
 Angela Buxton, England, won 1956 French women's doubles (w/Althea Gibson) and 1956 Wimbledon women's doubles (w/Gibson), highest world ranking No. 9
 Audra Cohen, US, 2007 NCAA Women's Singles champion
Julia Cohen, US, USTA girls 12s & 18s singles champion
 Stéphanie Cohen-Aloro, France
 Brian Dabul, Argentina, #1 junior in the world
 Pierre Darmon, France, highest world ranking No. 8
 Uberto De Morpurgo, Italy, highest world ranking No.  8
 Irvin Dorfman, US
Eva Duldig, Austria/the Netherlands/Australia
 Vlada Ekshibarova, Uzbekistan/Israel
Jonathan Erlich, Israel, won 2008 Australian Open men's doubles (w/Andy Ram), highest world doubles ranking No. 5
 Gastón Etlis, Argentina
 Marcel Felder, Uruguay
Sharon Fichman, Canada
 Herbert Flam, US, 2× USTA boys 18s singles champion, highest world ranking No. 5
 Allen Fox, US
 Mike Franks, US
 Brad Gilbert, US, highest world ranking No.  4, Olympic bronze (singles)
 Justin Gimelstob, US, USTA boys 16s & 18s singles champion, won 1998 Australian Open mixed doubles (w/Venus Williams) and 1998 French Open mixed doubles (w/Venus Williams)
Camila Giorgi, Italy
 Shlomo Glickstein, Israel
Julia Glushko, Israel
 Grant Golden, US
 Paul Goldstein, US, USTA boys 16s & 2× 18s singles champion
 Brian Gottfried, US, USTA boys 12s & 2× 18s singles champion, won 1975 & 1977 French Open men's doubles (w/Raúl Ramírez), and 1976 Wimbledon men's doubles (w/Ramirez), highest world singles ranking No. 3, and doubles ranking No. 2.
 Jim Grabb, US, won 1989 French Open men's doubles (w/Richey Reneberg) and 1992 US Open men's doubles (w/Patrick McEnroe), highest world doubles ranking No. 1
 Seymour Greenberg, US
 Jim Gurfein, US
 Julie Heldman, US, US girls 15s & 18s singles champion, highest world ranking No. 5
 Helen Jacobs, US, won 1932–35 US women's singles, 1932–35 US women's doubles (w/Sarah Palfrey Cooke), 1934 US mixed (w/George Lott), and 1936 Wimbledon women's singles, highest world singles ranking No. 1
 Martín Jaite, Argentina, highest world ranking No. 10
 Anita Kanter, US, US girls 18s singles champion
Aslan Karatsev, Russian-Israeli tennis player
 Ilana Kloss, South Africa, won 1976 US Open women's doubles (w/Linky Boshoff), highest world doubles ranking No. 1
 Zsuzsa Körmöczy, Hungary, won 1958 French singles
 Aaron Krickstein, US, USTA boys 16s & 18s singles champion, highest world ranking No. 6
 Steve Krulevitz, US/Israel
 Jesse Levine, Canada/US, 2005 Wimbledon boys' doubles champion
Jon Levine, US
 Harel Levy, Israel
 Evgenia Linetskaya, Israel
Scott Lipsky, US, USTA # 1 junior in singles (1995) and doubles (1995–97); won 2011 French Open mixed doubles (w/Casey Dellacqua)
 Jamie Loeb, US, 2012 US 18s singles and doubles champion, 2015 NCAA singles champion.
 Amos Mansdorf, Israel
 Bruce Manson, US
 Stacy Margolin, US
 Nicolás Massú, Chile, highest world ranking No.  9, 2× Olympic champion (singles & doubles)
 Sam Match, US
 Tzipora Obziler, Israel
 Tom Okker, Dutch, won 1973 French Open men's doubles (w/John Newcombe), 1976 US Open men's doubles (w/Marty Riessen), highest world ranking No.  3 in singles, and # 1 in doubles
 Noam Okun, Israel
Yshai Oliel, Israel, 2016 French Open boys' doubles champion
 Shahar Pe'er, Israel, highest world ranking No. 11
 Keren Shlomo, Israel
 Shahar Perkiss, Israel
 Felix Pipes, Austria, Olympic silver (doubles)
 Daniel Prenn, Germany & Britain, highest world ranking No. 6
 Henry Prusoff, US
Andy Ram, Israel, won 2006 Wimbledon mixed doubles (w/Vera Zvonareva), 2007 French Open mixed doubles (w/Nathalie Dechy), 2008 Australian Open men's doubles (w/Jonathan Erlich), highest world doubles ranking No. 5
 Renée Richards, US
 Sergio Roitman, Argentina
Noah Rubin, US, 2014 Wimbledon junior singles champion, 2014 US boys 18s champion in singles & doubles
 Michael Russell, US, ranked No.  1 in USTA boys 16s & 18s, all-time-record 23 USTA Pro Circuit singles titles
 Jeff Salzenstein, US, 1986 US boys' 12 Hard Court Singles & Doubles Champion
 Dick Savitt, US, won 1951 Wimbledon men's singles, highest world ranking No. 2
Diego Schwartzman, Argentina, highest world ranking No. 8
 Abe Segal, South Africa
 Vic Seixas, US, won 1952 US men's doubles (w/Mervyn Rose), 1953 Wimbledon men's singles, 1953 & 1955 Wimbledon mixed doubles (w/Doris Hart), 1953 French mixed doubles (w/Hart), 1953–55 US mixed doubles (w/Hart), 1954 Wimbledon mixed doubles (w/Hart), 1954 US men's, 1954 US men's doubles (w/Tony Trabert), 1954–55 French men's doubles (w/Trabert), 1955 Australian men's doubles (w/Trabert), and 1956 Wimbledon mixed doubles (w/Shirley Fry), highest world ranking No. 3
Dudi Sela, Israel, 2003 French Open junior doubles champion
 Julius Seligson, US, 2× boys 18s singles champion
  Denis Shapovalov, Israeli-born Canadian, highest world ranking No. 10
 Anna Smashnova, Israel, highest world ranking No.  15
 Harold Solomon, US, US boys 18s singles champion, highest world ranking No.  5
 Andrew Sznajder, Canada
 Brian Teacher, US, US boys 18s singles champion, won 1980 Australian Open singles, highest world ranking No.  7
 Eliot Teltscher, US, won 1983 French Open mixed doubles (w/Barbara Jordan), highest world ranking No.  6
 Van Winitsky, US, 1977 Junior Wimbledon and Junior US Open champion
 Robbie Weiss, US, 1988 NCAA Division 1 Champion, All-American 1986 and 1988

Track and field

 Harold Abrahams, Britain, sprinter, Olympic champion (100 metre sprint) & silver (4 × 100 m relay)
 Sir Sidney Abrahams, Britain, Olympic long jumper
 Jo Ankier, Britain, record holder (1,500m & 3,000m steeplechase)
 Gerry Ashworth, US, Olympic champion (4 × 100m relay)
 Aleksandr Averbukh, Israel, 2002 & 2006 European champion (pole vault)
 Seteng Ayele, Ethiopia/Israel, Olympic marathon
 Marhu Teferi, Ethiopia/Israel, Olympic marathon
 Gretel Bergmann, German Jewish high jumper
 Ödön Bodor, Hungary, Olympic bronze (medley relay)
 Louis "Pinky" Clarke, US, world record (100 m); Olympic champion (4 × 100m)
 Janet Cohansedgh, Iran
 Lillian Copeland, US, world records (javelin, discus throw, and shot put); Olympic champion & silver (discus)
 Ibolya Csák, Hungary, Olympic champion & European champion high jumper
 Daniel Frank, US, long jump, Olympic silver
 Danielle Frenkel, Israel, high jumper, 2× national champion
 Hugo Friend, US, long jump, Olympic bronze
 Jim Fuchs, US, shot put & discus, 2× Olympic bronze (shot put); 4× shot put world record holder, 2× Pan American champions (shot put & discus)
 Marty Glickman, US, sprinter & broadcaster; US Olympic team, All American (football)
 Adam Goucher, US, 3:54 miler, 2000 Olympian, 1998 NCAA Division I Cross Country Championships winner, 3rd in 2006 Prefontaine Classic 2-mile
 Milton Green, US, world records (45 yard & 60m high hurdles)
 Ageze Guadie, Israel, Olympic marathon-runner
 Gary Gubner, US, world shot put records, weightlifter
 Lilli Henoch, Germany, world records (discus, shot put, and 4 × 100m relay); shot by the Nazis in Latvia
 Abby Hoffman, Canada, four-time Olympian (800m)
 Maria Leontyavna Itkina, USSR, sprinter, world records (400 m & , and 800m relay)
 Clare Jacobs, US, pole vaulter, Olympic bronze, world indoor record
 Harry Kane, British hurdler, held national records in the 1950s
Deena (Drossin) Kastor, US, long-distance & marathon runner, US records (marathon & half-marathon); Olympic bronze (marathon)
 Elias Katz, Finland, Olympic champion (3,000 m team steeplechase) & silver (3,000 m steeplechase)
 Abel Kiviat, US, world records (2,400-yard relay & 1,500m); Olympic champion (3,000 m team) & silver (1,500m)
 Mór Kóczán, Hungary, javelin, Olympic bronze
 Svetlana Krachevskaya, USSR, shot put, Olympic silver
 Shaul Ladany, Yugoslavian-born Israeli racewalker, world record holder in the 50-mile walk, former world champion in the 100-kilometer walk
 Margaret Bergmann Lambert, US, champion (high jump & shot put), British high jump champion
 Henry Laskau, German-born US racewalker, won 42 national titles; Pan American champion; 4× Maccabiah champion
 Faina Melnik, Ukrainian-born USSR, 11 world records; Olympic discus throw champion
 Alvah Meyer, US, runner, 2 world records (60 y & 300 y); Olympic silver (100 m)
 Jemima Montag, Australia, 20 km race walk, Olympian
 Lon Myers, US, sprinter, world records (quarter-mile, 100-yard, and 880-yard)
 Zhanna Pintusevich-Block, Ukraine, sprinter, world 100m & 200m champion
 Irina Press, USSR, 2× Olympic champion (80 m hurdles & pentathlon)
 Tamara Press, USSR, 6 world records (shot put & discus); 3× Olympic champion (2× shot put & discus) and silver (discus)
 Myer Prinstein, US, world record (long jump); 3× Olympic champion (2× triple jump & long jump) and silver (long jump)
 Fanny "Bobbie" Rosenfeld, Canada, runner & long jumper, world record (100-yard dash); Olympic champion (4 × 100m relay) & silver (100m)
 Steven Solomon, Australia, sprinter, 2× Australian 400 metres champion
 Sam Stoller, US, world indoor record (60-yard dash)
 Dwight Stones, US, world record (high jump); 2× Olympic bronze
 Irena Szewińska, Poland, sprinter & long jumper, world records (100m, 200m, and 400m); 3× Olympic champion (4 × 100m, 200m, 400m), 2 silver (200 m & long jump), and 2 bronze 1968 (100m & 200m)
Allan Tolmich, US, world records in the indoor 45 low hurdles, indoor 50 low hurdles, indoor 60-yard hurdles, 70 high hurdles, and 200m hurdles.

Triathlon

Joanna Zeiger, US, triathlete, Ironman 70.3 world champion; world record (half ironman)

Volleyball

 Nelly Abramova, USSR, Olympic silver
 Doug Beal, US, player & coach, national team
Adriana Behar, Brazil, beach player; 2× Olympic silver; Pan American champion; 2× world champion
Larisa Bergen, USSR, Olympic silver
 Yefim Chulak, USSR, Olympic silver, bronze
Marcelo Elgarten, Brazil, Olympic silver
 Dan Greenbaum, US, Olympic bronze
 Eliezer Kalina, Israel, 3× Paralympic gold
 Waldo Kantor, Argentina, Olympic bronze
 Alix Klineman, US, Olympic gold (women's beach volleyball) at the 2020 Summer Olympics
 Nataliya Kushnir, USSR, Olympic silver
 Yevgeny Lapinsky, USSR, Olympic champion, bronze
 Georgy Mondzolevsky, USSR, 2× Olympic champion, 2× world champion
 Vladimir Patkin, USSR, Olympic silver, bronze
 Igal Pazi, Israel, 2× Paralympic gold
 Bernard Rajzman, Brazil, Olympic silver; Pan American champion; world silver
 Sam Schachter, Canada
 Aryeh "Arie" Selinger, US & Dutch, player & coach
 Avital Selinger, Dutch, Olympic silver
 Eugene Selznick, US, 2× world champion, 2× Pan American champion, Hall of Fame
 Sandy Silver, Canada, Inducted Hall of Fame, Volleyball Canada, 2013
 Yuriy Venherovsky, USSR, Olympic champion
 Chagai Zamir, Israel, 4× Paralympic Games champion

Water polo

 Róbert Antal, Hungary, Olympic champion
 Peter Asch, US, Olympic bronze
 István Barta, Hungary, Goalkeeper, Olympic champion, 1× gold, 1× Silver
 Gerard Blitz, Belgium, 2× Olympic silver, 2× bronze (one in swimming–100m backstroke), International Swimming Hall of Fame, son of Maurice Blitz
 Maurice Blitz, Belgium, 2× Olympic silver, father of Gérard Blitz
 György Bródy, Hungary, goalkeeper, 2× Olympic champion
 Henri Cohen, Belgium, Olympic silver
 Kurt Epstein, Czechoslovak national team, Olympic competitor
 Boris Goikhman, USSR, goalkeeper, Olympic silver, bronze
 György Kárpáti, Hungary, 3× Olympic champion, 1× bronze
 Béla Komjádi, Hungary, player and coach
 Jillian Kraus, US, defender, World Junior, gold
Mihály Mayer, Hungary, 2× Olympic champion, 2× bronze
 Nikolai Melnikov, USSR, Olympic champion
Merrill Moses, US, goalkeeper, Olympic silver, Pan American champion
 Miklós Sárkány, Hungary, 2× Olympic champion

Weightlifting

 David Mark Berger, US-born Israeli, Maccabiah champion (middleweight); killed by terrorists in the Munich massacre
 Isaac "Ike" Berger, US, Olympic champion (featherweight), 2× silver; 2× Pan American champion; 23 world records
 Robert Fein, US, Olympic champion (lightweight)
 Gary Gubner, US, 4 junior world records (heavyweight); 3× Maccabiah champion (weightlifting, shot put, discus)
 Hans Haas, Austria, Olympic champion (lightweight), silver
 Ben Helfgott, Polish-born British, 3× British champion (lightweight), 3× Maccabiah champion; survived Buchenwald and Theresienstadt concentration camps, as all but one other of his family were killed by the Nazis
 Reuven Helman, Maccabiah Olympian and Israeli Weightlifting Champion
 Moisei Kas’ianik, Ukrainian-born USSR, world champion
 Nora Köppel, Argentina, Olympian 
 Naomi Kutin, US, world record in 44 kg weight class
 Edward Lawrence Levy, Great Britain, world weightlifting champion; 14 world records
 Darío Lecman, Argentina, Pan-American silver (middle-heavyweight)
 Grigory Novak, Soviet, Olympic silver (middle-heavyweight); world champion
 Igor Rybak, Ukrainian-born USSR, Olympic champion (lightweight)
 Valery Shary, Byelorussian-born USSR, Olympic champion (light-heavyweight)
 Frank Spellman, US, Olympic champion (middleweight); world record; Maccabiah champion

Wrestling

Lindsey Durlacher, US, world bronze (Greco-Roman)
 Grigoriy Gamarnik, Ukrainian-born Soviet, world champion (Greco-Roman lightweight), world championship gold and silver
 Samuel Gerson, Ukrainian-born US, Olympic silver (freestyle featherweight)
 Boris Maksimovich Gurevich, Soviet, Olympic champion (Greco-Roman flyweight), 2× world champion
 Boris Mikhaylovich Gurevich, USSR, Olympic champion (freestyle middleweight), 2× world champion
 Nickolaus "Mickey" Hirschl, Austria, 2× Olympic bronze (heavyweight freestyle and Greco-Roman)
 Oleg Karavaev, USSR, Olympic champion (Greco-Roman bantamweight), 2× world champion
 Károly Kárpáti (also "Károly Kellner"), Hungary, Olympic champion (freestyle lightweight), silver
 Abraham Kurland, Denmark, Olympic silver (Greco-Roman lightweight)
 Len Levy, US, NCAA national champion
 Fred Meyer, US, Olympic bronze (freestyle heavyweight)
 Fred Oberlander, Austrian, British, and Canadian wrestler; world champion (freestyle heavyweight); Maccabiah champion
 Max Ordman, South African, competed in the Olympic Games of 1960 (freestyle light-heavyweight), Gold 1950 Maccabiah
 Yakov Punkin, Soviet, Olympic champion (Greco-Roman featherweight)
 Samuel Rabin, Great Britain, Olympic bronze (freestyle middleweight)
 David Rudman, USSR, USSR 6× wrestling champion and 6× sambo champion, sambo world champion, 2× European judo champion
 Richárd Weisz, Hungary, Olympic champion (Greco-Roman super heavyweight)
 Henry Wittenberg, US, Olympic champion (freestyle light-heavyweight), silver

Professional wrestling

David Arquette, former WCW World Heavyweight Championship
Lior Ben-David
Matt Bloom (a.k.a. Jason Albert, "Albert", "A-Train", and "Tensai"), US, WWE Intercontinental Champion and IWGP World Tag Team Champion
 Beau Beverly (Wayne Bloom), member of WWE tag team the Beverly Brothers
Matt Sydal (Matt Korklan; a.k.a. Evan Bourne), US, WWE Tag Team Champion
 Eddie Creatchman
 Floyd Creatchman
Colt Cabana (Scott Colton), US, a.k.a. "Scotty Goldman", 2× NWA World Heavyweight Champion
Ric Drasin
Noam Dar, Israeli-born Scottish professional wrestler
Maxwell Jacob Friedman
Joel Gertner
Bill Goldberg, US, 1× WCW World Heavyweight Champion, 1× World Heavyweight Champion and 2× WWE Universal Champion, second longest winning streak in professional wrestling
Karl Gotch
Simon Gotch
 Drew Gulak, US, former WWE/NXT Cruiserweight Champion
Rafael Halperin, Austrian-born Israeli
Paul Heyman
 Barry Horowitz, US
Abe Jacobs
Andy Kaufman
Billy Kidman
 Kelly Kelly (Barbie Blank), US, WWE Divas Champion and WWE 24/7 Champion
Yakov Kozalchik
 Butch Levy (Len Levy), US, 2× NWA World Tag Team Champion
Donn Lewin
Mark Lewin
Ted Lewin
 Boris Malenko (Lawrence Simon), US, multiple professional wrestling championships throughout the 1960s and 1970s
 Chad Malenko (Chad Collyer), US, 4× RQW Heavyweight Champion
 Dean Malenko (Dean Simon), US, 2× WWF Light Heavyweight Champion
Joe Malenko
Ida Mae Martinez
 Leapin' Lanny Poffo ("The Genius"), Canada-US, Savage's brother
Raven (Scott Levy), US, 2× ECW World Heavyweight Champion, NWA World Heavyweight Champion, and 27× WWF/E Hardcore Champion
Ernie Roth
Bert Ruby
 Randy Savage (Randall Poffo), US, 2× WWF World Heavyweight Champion and WCW World Heavyweight Champion
Scott L. Schwartz
Marina Shafir
Tomer Shalom
Izzy Slapawitz
David Starr
Ray Stern
Matt Stryker
Lisa Marie Varon (aka "Victoria" and "Tara"), US, 2× WWE Women's Champion, 5× TNA Knockouts Champion)

Jewish sports halls of fame

 International Jewish Sports Hall of Fame (Netanya, Israel)
 Jewish Canadian Athletes Hall of Fame
 National Jewish Sports Hall of Fame and Museum (US)
 Jewish Sports Hall of Fame of Northern California
 Southern California Jewish Sports Hall of Fame
 Orange County Jewish Sports Hall of Fame (California)
 Michigan Jewish Sports Hall of Fame
 Rochester Jewish Sports Hall of Fame (NY)
 Jewish Sports Hall of Fame of Western Pennsylvania
 Philadelphia Jewish Sports Hall of Fame (Pennsylvania)

See also
 List of Jews in sports (non-players), a list of Jewish sports commissioners, managers, coaches, officials, owners, promoters, and sportscasters.
 List of Jewish American sportspeople
 List of Jewish chess players
 List of Jewish footballers
 Jewish Sports Review (JSR) magazine.
 Jews and Baseball: An American Love Story

References

Notes

Bibliography

General works 
 Encyclopedia of Jews in Sports, Bernard Postal, Jesse Silver, Roy Silver, Bloch Pub. Co., 1965
 The Jewish Athlete: A Nostalgic View, Leible Hershfield, s.n., 1980
 From the Ghetto to the Games: Jewish Athletes in Hungary, Andrew Handler, East European Monographs, 1985, 
 The Jew in American Sports, Harold Uriel Ribalow, Meir Z. Ribalow, Edition 4, Hippocrene Books, 1985, 
 The Jewish Athletes Hall of Fame, B. P. Robert Stephen Silverman, Shapolsky Publishers, 1989, 
 The International Jewish Sports Hall of Fame, Joseph M. Siegman, SP Books, 1992, 
 Ellis Island to Ebbets Field: Sport and the American Jewish Experience, Peter Levine, Oxford University Press US, 1993, 
 The Jewish Child's Book of Sports Heroes, Robert Slater, Jonathan David Publishers, 1993, 
 Sports and the American Jew, Steven A. Riess, Syracuse University Press, 1998, 
 Jewish Sports Legends: the International Jewish Hall of Fame, 3rd Ed, Joseph Siegman, Brassey's, 2000, 
 The 100 Greatest Jews in Sports: Ranked According to Achievement, B. P. Robert Stephen Silverman, Scarecrow Press, 2003, 
 Great Jews in Sports, Robert Slater, Jonathan David Publishers, 2004, 
 Judaism's Encounter with American Sports, Jeffrey S. Gurock, Indiana University Press, 2005, 
 Emancipation through Muscles: Jews and Sports in Europe, Michael Brenner, Gideon Reuveni, translated by Brenner, Reuveni, U of Nebraska Press, 2006, 
 Jewish Sports Stars: Athletic Heroes Past and Present, David J. Goldman, Edition 2, Kar-Ben Publishing, 2006, 
 The Big Book of Jewish Athletes: Two Centuries of Jews in Sports – a Visual History, Peter S. Horvitz, Joachim Horvitz, S P I Books, 2007, 
 The Big Book of Jewish Sports Heroes: An Illustrated Compendium of Sports History and The 150 Greatest Jewish Sports Stars, Peter S. Horvitz, SP Books, 2007, 
 Jews, Sports, and the Rites of Citizenship, Jack Kugelmass, University of Illinois Press, 2007, 
 Day by Day in Jewish Sports History, Bob Wechsler, KTAV Publishing House, 2008, 
 Jews and the Sporting Life, Vol. 23 of Studies in Contemporary Jewry, Ezra Mendelsohn, Oxford University Press US, 2009,

Baseball 
 Jewish Baseball Stars, Harold Uriel Ribalow, Meir Z. Ribalow, Hippocrene Books, 1984, 
 The Jewish Baseball Hall of Fame: a Who's Who of Baseball Stars, Erwin Lynn, Shapolsky Publishers, 1986, 
 The Big Book of Jewish Baseball: An Illustrated Encyclopedia & Anecdotal History, Peter S. Horvitz, Joachim Horvitz, SP Books, 2001, 
 Jews and Baseball: Entering the American Mainstream, 1871–1948, Burton Alan Boxerman, Benita W. Boxerman, McFarland, 2006, 
 The New Big Book of Jewish Baseball: An Illustrated Encyclopedia & Anecdotal History, Peter S. Horvitz, Joachim Horvitz, Perseus Distribution Services, 2007, 
 The Baseball Talmud: The Definitive Position-by-Position Ranking of Baseball's Chosen Players, Howard Megdal, Collins, 2009, 
 Jews and Baseball: The Post-Greenberg Years, 1949–2008, Burton Alan Boxerman, Benita W. Boxerman, McFarland, 2010, 
 American Jews and America's Game, Larry Ruttman, University of Nebraska Press, 2013,

Boxing 
 The Jewish Boxers Hall of Fame, Ken Blady, SP Books, 1988, 
 When boxing was a Jewish sport When Boxing Was a Jewish Sport, Allen Bodner, Praeger, 1997,

Chess 
 The Great Jewish Chess Champions, Harold U. Ribalow, Meir Z. Ribalow, Hippocrene Books, 1987,

Olympics
  Foiled, Hitler's Jewish Olympian: the Helene Mayer Story, Milly Mogulof, RDR Books, 2002, 
 Jews and the Olympic Games: The Clash between Sport and Politics: with a complete review of Jewish Olympic medallists, Paul Taylor, Sussex Academic Press, 2004, 
 Jews and the Olympic Games; Sport: Springboard for Minorities, Paul Yogi Mayer, Vallentine Mitchell, 2004,

External links
 Jews in Sports

 
Sports
Jews